This is a partial list of unnumbered minor planets for principal provisional designations assigned during 16–30 September 2003. Since this period yielded a high number of provisional discoveries, it is further split into several standalone pages. , a total of 517 bodies remain unnumbered for this period. Objects for this year are listed on the following pages: A–E · F–G · H–L · M–R · Si · Sii · Siii · Siv · T · Ui · Uii · Uiii · Uiv · V · Wi · Wii and X–Y. Also see previous and next year.

S 

|- id="2003 SA" bgcolor=#FA8072
| 2 || 2003 SA || MCA || 20.0 || data-sort-value="0.30" | 300 m || multiple || 2003–2014 || 24 Sep 2014 || 106 || align=left | Disc.: LONEOSAlt.: 2014 SK144 || 
|- id="2003 SD" bgcolor=#FA8072
| 1 || 2003 SD || MCA || 19.6 || data-sort-value="0.36" | 360 m || multiple || 2003–2017 || 23 Oct 2017 || 61 || align=left | Disc.: NEAT || 
|- id="2003 SF" bgcolor=#FFC2E0
| 0 || 2003 SF || APO || 19.82 || data-sort-value="0.39" | 390 m || multiple || 2003–2019 || 03 Oct 2019 || 107 || align=left | Disc.: LINEARAlt.: 2019 QC3 || 
|- id="2003 SL" bgcolor=#d6d6d6
| 0 || 2003 SL || MBA-O || 17.1 || 2.1 km || multiple || 2003–2019 || 25 Oct 2019 || 48 || align=left | Disc.: Spacewatch || 
|- id="2003 SU" bgcolor=#fefefe
| 1 || 2003 SU || MBA-I || 18.8 || data-sort-value="0.52" | 520 m || multiple || 2003–2018 || 30 Sep 2018 || 48 || align=left | Disc.: Spacewatch || 
|- id="2003 SZ" bgcolor=#fefefe
| 0 || 2003 SZ || MBA-I || 18.8 || data-sort-value="0.52" | 520 m || multiple || 2003–2019 || 29 Jun 2019 || 45 || align=left | Disc.: Spacewatch || 
|- id="2003 SN1" bgcolor=#d6d6d6
| 3 ||  || MBA-O || 17.8 || 1.5 km || multiple || 2003–2019 || 28 Oct 2019 || 29 || align=left | Disc.: Spacewatch || 
|- id="2003 SS1" bgcolor=#d6d6d6
| 0 ||  || MBA-O || 17.02 || 2.2 km || multiple || 2003–2021 || 01 May 2021 || 151 || align=left | Disc.: SpacewatchAlt.: 2008 RA143, 2013 ST60, 2015 AJ60 || 
|- id="2003 SZ1" bgcolor=#d6d6d6
| 0 ||  || MBA-O || 17.4 || 1.8 km || multiple || 2003–2020 || 16 Aug 2020 || 29 || align=left | Disc.: SpacewatchAdded on 21 August 2021Alt.: 2020 OY100 || 
|- id="2003 SF2" bgcolor=#d6d6d6
| 0 ||  || MBA-O || 17.0 || 2.2 km || multiple || 2000–2020 || 08 Dec 2020 || 83 || align=left | Disc.: SpacewatchAdded on 19 October 2020Alt.: 2014 QO400 || 
|- id="2003 SR2" bgcolor=#E9E9E9
| 0 ||  || MBA-M || 18.55 || data-sort-value="0.82" | 820 m || multiple || 2001–2022 || 24 Jan 2022 || 64 || align=left | Disc.: LPL/Spacewatch II || 
|- id="2003 SP3" bgcolor=#E9E9E9
| 0 ||  || MBA-M || 17.5 || 1.3 km || multiple || 2003–2021 || 12 Jan 2021 || 106 || align=left | Disc.: LPL/Spacewatch IIAlt.: 2015 HD216 || 
|- id="2003 SU3" bgcolor=#fefefe
| 1 ||  || MBA-I || 19.0 || data-sort-value="0.47" | 470 m || multiple || 1996–2021 || 28 Nov 2021 || 52 || align=left | Disc.: LPL/Spacewatch IIAdded on 24 December 2021 || 
|- id="2003 SB4" bgcolor=#E9E9E9
| 0 ||  || MBA-M || 17.4 || data-sort-value="0.98" | 980 m || multiple || 2003–2021 || 12 Jan 2021 || 121 || align=left | Disc.: LPL/Spacewatch II || 
|- id="2003 SL4" bgcolor=#E9E9E9
| 0 ||  || MBA-M || 17.6 || 1.3 km || multiple || 2003–2020 || 15 Sep 2020 || 65 || align=left | Disc.: LPL/Spacewatch II || 
|- id="2003 SY4" bgcolor=#FFC2E0
| 6 ||  || APO || 26.5 || data-sort-value="0.018" | 18 m || single || 10 days || 26 Sep 2003 || 66 || align=left | Disc.: LPL/Spacewatch II || 
|- id="2003 SJ5" bgcolor=#FA8072
| – ||  || MCA || 19.9 || data-sort-value="0.44" | 440 m || single || 2 days || 18 Sep 2003 || 19 || align=left | Disc.: LINEAR || 
|- id="2003 SK5" bgcolor=#FFC2E0
| 0 ||  || AMO || 20.0 || data-sort-value="0.36" | 360 m || multiple || 2003–2012 || 24 Apr 2012 || 190 || align=left | Disc.: NEAT || 
|- id="2003 SL5" bgcolor=#FFC2E0
| 1 ||  || AMO || 19.2 || data-sort-value="0.51" | 510 m || multiple || 2003–2012 || 26 Apr 2012 || 183 || align=left | Disc.: LINEAR || 
|- id="2003 SM5" bgcolor=#fefefe
| 0 ||  || MBA-I || 19.27 || data-sort-value="0.42" | 420 m || multiple || 2003–2021 || 30 Nov 2021 || 58 || align=left | Disc.: Spacewatch || 
|- id="2003 SO5" bgcolor=#d6d6d6
| 1 ||  || MBA-O || 18.3 || 1.2 km || multiple || 2003–2019 || 02 Oct 2019 || 47 || align=left | Disc.: Spacewatch || 
|- id="2003 SV5" bgcolor=#E9E9E9
| 0 ||  || MBA-M || 17.46 || 1.4 km || multiple || 2003–2022 || 25 Jan 2022 || 109 || align=left | Disc.: Table Mountain Obs.Alt.: 2016 QC39 || 
|- id="2003 SW5" bgcolor=#fefefe
| 0 ||  || MBA-I || 18.10 || data-sort-value="0.71" | 710 m || multiple || 2003–2021 || 13 Apr 2021 || 70 || align=left | Disc.: SpacewatchAlt.: 2007 TZ333 || 
|- id="2003 SA6" bgcolor=#E9E9E9
| 0 ||  || MBA-M || 17.80 || 1.2 km || multiple || 2003–2022 || 27 Jan 2022 || 89 || align=left | Disc.: SpacewatchAlt.: 2016 SM40 || 
|- id="2003 SS6" bgcolor=#FA8072
| – ||  || MCA || 20.5 || data-sort-value="0.24" | 240 m || single || 4 days || 21 Sep 2003 || 15 || align=left | Disc.: Spacewatch || 
|- id="2003 SY6" bgcolor=#d6d6d6
| 0 ||  || MBA-O || 16.3 || 3.1 km || multiple || 2003–2021 || 17 Jan 2021 || 175 || align=left | Disc.: SpacewatchAlt.: 2014 OV198 || 
|- id="2003 SZ6" bgcolor=#E9E9E9
| 0 ||  || MBA-M || 16.7 || 2.5 km || multiple || 2003–2020 || 25 Mar 2020 || 68 || align=left | Disc.: Spacewatch || 
|- id="2003 SA7" bgcolor=#d6d6d6
| 0 ||  || MBA-O || 16.66 || 2.6 km || multiple || 2003–2021 || 05 Jan 2021 || 195 || align=left | Disc.: NEAT || 
|- id="2003 SE7" bgcolor=#fefefe
| 0 ||  || MBA-I || 18.75 || data-sort-value="0.53" | 530 m || multiple || 2003–2020 || 14 Jun 2020 || 62 || align=left | Disc.: Spacewatch || 
|- id="2003 SN7" bgcolor=#E9E9E9
| 1 ||  || MBA-M || 18.4 || data-sort-value="0.88" | 880 m || multiple || 2003–2020 || 23 Jul 2020 || 34 || align=left | Disc.: LPL/Spacewatch IIAdded on 17 January 2021 || 
|- id="2003 SU7" bgcolor=#d6d6d6
| 0 ||  || MBA-O || 17.3 || 1.9 km || multiple || 2003–2020 || 19 Jan 2020 || 99 || align=left | Disc.: NEAT || 
|- id="2003 SG8" bgcolor=#E9E9E9
| 0 ||  || MBA-M || 17.85 || 1.5 km || multiple || 2003–2021 || 09 Nov 2021 || 55 || align=left | Disc.: LPL/Spacewatch II || 
|- id="2003 SJ8" bgcolor=#fefefe
| 0 ||  || MBA-I || 18.6 || data-sort-value="0.57" | 570 m || multiple || 2003–2020 || 15 Oct 2020 || 72 || align=left | Disc.: LPL/Spacewatch II || 
|- id="2003 SP8" bgcolor=#fefefe
| 0 ||  || MBA-I || 18.47 || data-sort-value="0.60" | 600 m || multiple || 2003–2021 || 27 Nov 2021 || 137 || align=left | Disc.: LPL/Spacewatch IIAlt.: 2015 AE4 || 
|- id="2003 SV8" bgcolor=#E9E9E9
| 0 ||  || MBA-M || 18.2 || data-sort-value="0.68" | 680 m || multiple || 2003–2021 || 05 Feb 2021 || 39 || align=left | Disc.: LPL/Spacewatch IIAdded on 11 May 2021Alt.: 2020 YY19 || 
|- id="2003 SZ8" bgcolor=#d6d6d6
| 0 ||  || MBA-O || 16.8 || 2.4 km || multiple || 2003–2021 || 16 Jan 2021 || 110 || align=left | Disc.: LPL/Spacewatch II || 
|- id="2003 SA9" bgcolor=#E9E9E9
| 0 ||  || MBA-M || 17.6 || 1.7 km || multiple || 2003–2020 || 28 Apr 2020 || 74 || align=left | Disc.: LPL/Spacewatch II || 
|- id="2003 SC9" bgcolor=#E9E9E9
| 3 ||  || MBA-M || 18.2 || data-sort-value="0.96" | 960 m || multiple || 2003–2020 || 05 Nov 2020 || 53 || align=left | Disc.: LPL/Spacewatch II || 
|- id="2003 SG9" bgcolor=#E9E9E9
| 0 ||  || MBA-M || 17.7 || 1.2 km || multiple || 2003–2021 || 08 Jan 2021 || 121 || align=left | Disc.: NEATAlt.: 2015 KS13 || 
|- id="2003 SH9" bgcolor=#fefefe
| 0 ||  || MBA-I || 17.9 || data-sort-value="0.78" | 780 m || multiple || 2003–2019 || 26 Nov 2019 || 184 || align=left | Disc.: NEAT || 
|- id="2003 SN9" bgcolor=#E9E9E9
| 0 ||  || MBA-M || 17.70 || 1.6 km || multiple || 2003–2021 || 08 Sep 2021 || 63 || align=left | Disc.: Spacewatch || 
|- id="2003 SO9" bgcolor=#E9E9E9
| 0 ||  || MBA-M || 17.6 || 1.3 km || multiple || 2003–2020 || 20 Dec 2020 || 191 || align=left | Disc.: SpacewatchAlt.: 2016 UC68 || 
|- id="2003 ST9" bgcolor=#E9E9E9
| 1 ||  || MBA-M || 18.49 || data-sort-value="0.60" | 600 m || multiple || 2003–2020 || 01 Aug 2020 || 18 || align=left | Disc.: LPL/Spacewatch II || 
|- id="2003 SX9" bgcolor=#E9E9E9
| 0 ||  || MBA-M || 18.4 || data-sort-value="0.62" | 620 m || multiple || 1999–2020 || 10 Dec 2020 || 37 || align=left | Disc.: SpacewatchAlt.: 2019 JG17 || 
|- id="2003 SZ9" bgcolor=#fefefe
| 0 ||  || MBA-I || 18.51 || data-sort-value="0.59" | 590 m || multiple || 2003–2021 || 09 May 2021 || 36 || align=left | Disc.: Spacewatch || 
|- id="2003 SJ11" bgcolor=#FA8072
| – ||  || MCA || 19.8 || data-sort-value="0.61" | 610 m || single || 32 days || 19 Oct 2003 || 17 || align=left | Disc.: NEAT || 
|- id="2003 SJ12" bgcolor=#E9E9E9
| 0 ||  || MBA-M || 17.46 || data-sort-value="0.96" | 960 m || multiple || 1995–2022 || 27 Jan 2022 || 127 || align=left | Disc.: SpacewatchAlt.: 2015 NA22, 2019 JA46 || 
|- id="2003 SQ12" bgcolor=#E9E9E9
| 0 ||  || MBA-M || 17.1 || 1.1 km || multiple || 2003–2021 || 15 Jan 2021 || 194 || align=left | Disc.: Spacewatch || 
|- id="2003 SM13" bgcolor=#E9E9E9
| 0 ||  || MBA-M || 16.8 || 1.3 km || multiple || 1999–2020 || 19 Dec 2020 || 119 || align=left | Disc.: Spacewatch || 
|- id="2003 SG14" bgcolor=#E9E9E9
| 0 ||  || MBA-M || 17.22 || 1.5 km || multiple || 2003–2021 || 28 Nov 2021 || 160 || align=left | Disc.: SpacewatchAlt.: 2012 SA18 || 
|- id="2003 SS14" bgcolor=#FA8072
| 0 ||  || MCA || 18.4 || data-sort-value="0.62" | 620 m || multiple || 2003–2019 || 26 Nov 2019 || 143 || align=left | Disc.: Spacewatch || 
|- id="2003 SC15" bgcolor=#FA8072
| 1 ||  || MCA || 18.6 || data-sort-value="0.57" | 570 m || multiple || 2003–2019 || 05 Oct 2019 || 85 || align=left | Disc.: SpacewatchAlt.: 2016 TJ31 || 
|- id="2003 SE15" bgcolor=#fefefe
| 0 ||  || MBA-I || 18.2 || data-sort-value="0.68" | 680 m || multiple || 2003–2021 || 08 Jun 2021 || 103 || align=left | Disc.: LPL/Spacewatch IIAlt.: 2007 VJ96 || 
|- id="2003 SQ15" bgcolor=#FFC2E0
| 1 ||  || APO || 19.0 || data-sort-value="0.56" | 560 m || multiple || 2003–2020 || 15 Mar 2020 || 92 || align=left | Disc.: LINEAR || 
|- id="2003 SF16" bgcolor=#fefefe
| – ||  || MBA-I || 18.4 || data-sort-value="0.62" | 620 m || single || 3 days || 20 Sep 2003 || 12 || align=left | Disc.: LPL/Spacewatch II || 
|- id="2003 SO16" bgcolor=#FA8072
| 0 ||  || MCA || 18.2 || data-sort-value="0.96" | 960 m || multiple || 2003–2021 || 12 Jan 2021 || 193 || align=left | Disc.: KLENOTAlt.: 2003 SU4, 2003 ST314 || 
|- id="2003 SS16" bgcolor=#d6d6d6
| 1 ||  || MBA-O || 17.83 || 1.5 km || multiple || 2003–2021 || 10 Feb 2021 || 35 || align=left | Disc.: SpacewatchAdded on 9 March 2021Alt.: 2019 RY24 || 
|- id="2003 SO17" bgcolor=#FA8072
| 1 ||  || HUN || 19.0 || data-sort-value="0.47" | 470 m || multiple || 2003–2021 || 29 May 2021 || 38 || align=left | Disc.: Spacewatch || 
|- id="2003 SY17" bgcolor=#FFC2E0
| 3 ||  || APO || 18.1 || data-sort-value="0.85" | 850 m || multiple || 2000–2012 || 12 Sep 2012 || 70 || align=left | Disc.: LPL/Spacewatch IINEO larger than 1 kilometer || 
|- id="2003 SZ17" bgcolor=#FA8072
| – ||  || MCA || 20.1 || data-sort-value="0.28" | 280 m || single || 12 days || 30 Sep 2003 || 36 || align=left | Disc.: NEAT || 
|- id="2003 SA18" bgcolor=#E9E9E9
| 0 ||  || MBA-M || 16.55 || 2.7 km || multiple || 2003–2022 || 25 Jan 2022 || 462 || align=left | Disc.: NEATAlt.: 2003 QD10 || 
|- id="2003 SF18" bgcolor=#E9E9E9
| 1 ||  || MBA-M || 19.0 || data-sort-value="0.67" | 670 m || multiple || 2003–2020 || 14 Aug 2020 || 35 || align=left | Disc.: LPL/Spacewatch II || 
|- id="2003 SG18" bgcolor=#FA8072
| 0 ||  || MCA || 18.8 || data-sort-value="0.52" | 520 m || multiple || 2003–2020 || 17 Nov 2020 || 143 || align=left | Disc.: LPL/Spacewatch II || 
|- id="2003 SW18" bgcolor=#E9E9E9
| 0 ||  || MBA-M || 18.0 || 1.1 km || multiple || 2003–2020 || 08 Sep 2020 || 63 || align=left | Disc.: Spacewatch || 
|- id="2003 SH19" bgcolor=#fefefe
| 0 ||  || MBA-I || 18.98 || data-sort-value="0.48" | 480 m || multiple || 2003–2021 || 07 Nov 2021 || 88 || align=left | Disc.: Spacewatch || 
|- id="2003 SJ19" bgcolor=#E9E9E9
| 3 ||  || MBA-M || 18.3 || data-sort-value="0.92" | 920 m || multiple || 2003–2020 || 11 Nov 2020 || 39 || align=left | Disc.: Spacewatch || 
|- id="2003 SL19" bgcolor=#fefefe
| 2 ||  || MBA-I || 19.0 || data-sort-value="0.47" | 470 m || multiple || 2003–2020 || 07 Dec 2020 || 32 || align=left | Disc.: SpacewatchAdded on 9 March 2021Alt.: 2020 RJ43 || 
|- id="2003 SN19" bgcolor=#E9E9E9
| 0 ||  || MBA-M || 16.6 || 2.7 km || multiple || 2003–2020 || 27 Apr 2020 || 115 || align=left | Disc.: SpacewatchAlt.: 2017 PM10 || 
|- id="2003 SQ19" bgcolor=#d6d6d6
| 0 ||  || MBA-O || 16.8 || 2.4 km || multiple || 2003–2020 || 19 Jan 2020 || 76 || align=left | Disc.: Spacewatch || 
|- id="2003 SU19" bgcolor=#fefefe
| 1 ||  || MBA-I || 18.5 || data-sort-value="0.59" | 590 m || multiple || 2002–2017 || 23 Oct 2017 || 38 || align=left | Disc.: Spacewatch || 
|- id="2003 SX19" bgcolor=#d6d6d6
| 0 ||  || MBA-O || 16.3 || 3.1 km || multiple || 2003–2020 || 15 Dec 2020 || 128 || align=left | Disc.: SpacewatchAlt.: 2006 DP145 || 
|- id="2003 SF20" bgcolor=#E9E9E9
| 0 ||  || MBA-M || 18.12 || 1.3 km || multiple || 2003–2021 || 08 Sep 2021 || 75 || align=left | Disc.: LPL/Spacewatch II || 
|- id="2003 SL20" bgcolor=#fefefe
| 1 ||  || MBA-I || 19.2 || data-sort-value="0.43" | 430 m || multiple || 2003–2020 || 14 Sep 2020 || 31 || align=left | Disc.: LPL/Spacewatch IIAdded on 19 October 2020 || 
|- id="2003 SS20" bgcolor=#fefefe
| 1 ||  || MBA-I || 19.1 || data-sort-value="0.45" | 450 m || multiple || 2003–2019 || 28 May 2019 || 32 || align=left | Disc.: SpacewatchAdded on 17 January 2021 || 
|- id="2003 SW20" bgcolor=#E9E9E9
| 1 ||  || MBA-M || 18.6 || data-sort-value="0.80" | 800 m || multiple || 2003–2020 || 16 Sep 2020 || 31 || align=left | Disc.: LPL/Spacewatch IIAdded on 19 October 2020 || 
|- id="2003 SZ20" bgcolor=#E9E9E9
| 0 ||  || MBA-M || 17.6 || data-sort-value="0.90" | 900 m || multiple || 2003–2021 || 11 Jan 2021 || 58 || align=left | Disc.: LPL/Spacewatch II || 
|- id="2003 SA21" bgcolor=#fefefe
| 0 ||  || MBA-I || 17.44 || data-sort-value="0.97" | 970 m || multiple || 2002–2021 || 04 Apr 2021 || 96 || align=left | Disc.: LPL/Spacewatch IIAlt.: 2007 RQ272 || 
|- id="2003 SM21" bgcolor=#E9E9E9
| 0 ||  || MBA-M || 18.49 || data-sort-value="0.84" | 840 m || multiple || 2003–2021 || 28 Nov 2021 || 58 || align=left | Disc.: LPL/Spacewatch II || 
|- id="2003 SX21" bgcolor=#fefefe
| 1 ||  || MBA-I || 18.8 || data-sort-value="0.52" | 520 m || multiple || 2003–2021 || 29 Aug 2021 || 33 || align=left | Disc.: LPL/Spacewatch IIAdded on 30 September 2021Alt.: 2021 NC36 || 
|- id="2003 SA23" bgcolor=#FA8072
| 0 ||  || MCA || 17.1 || 1.6 km || multiple || 2003–2020 || 26 Dec 2020 || 293 || align=left | Disc.: NEATAlt.: 2013 EC91 || 
|- id="2003 SB23" bgcolor=#FA8072
| 0 ||  || MCA || 18.4 || data-sort-value="0.62" | 620 m || multiple || 2003–2020 || 14 May 2020 || 52 || align=left | Disc.: NEAT || 
|- id="2003 SJ23" bgcolor=#FA8072
| 2 ||  || MCA || 17.9 || 1.1 km || multiple || 2003–2020 || 03 Dec 2020 || 64 || align=left | Disc.: AMOS || 
|- id="2003 SV23" bgcolor=#fefefe
| 0 ||  || MBA-I || 17.6 || data-sort-value="0.90" | 900 m || multiple || 1996–2020 || 01 Feb 2020 || 141 || align=left | Disc.: SpacewatchAlt.: 2013 EL59, 2014 SD21 || 
|- id="2003 SA24" bgcolor=#fefefe
| 1 ||  || MBA-I || 19.40 || data-sort-value="0.39" | 390 m || multiple || 2003–2021 || 29 Oct 2021 || 40 || align=left | Disc.: NEAT || 
|- id="2003 SB24" bgcolor=#E9E9E9
| 0 ||  || MBA-M || 17.9 || 1.1 km || multiple || 2003–2020 || 06 Dec 2020 || 148 || align=left | Disc.: NEAT || 
|- id="2003 SD24" bgcolor=#fefefe
| 3 ||  || MBA-I || 19.0 || data-sort-value="0.47" | 470 m || multiple || 2003–2016 || 03 Jan 2016 || 33 || align=left | Disc.: LPL/Spacewatch IIAlt.: 2007 UE13 || 
|- id="2003 SH24" bgcolor=#fefefe
| 0 ||  || MBA-I || 18.5 || data-sort-value="0.59" | 590 m || multiple || 2003–2018 || 09 Nov 2018 || 49 || align=left | Disc.: NEAT || 
|- id="2003 SX24" bgcolor=#fefefe
| 1 ||  || MBA-I || 18.2 || data-sort-value="0.68" | 680 m || multiple || 2003–2018 || 12 Dec 2018 || 46 || align=left | Disc.: SpacewatchAlt.: 2014 QT203 || 
|- id="2003 SZ24" bgcolor=#E9E9E9
| 0 ||  || MBA-M || 17.2 || 1.1 km || multiple || 1999–2021 || 08 Jan 2021 || 66 || align=left | Disc.: Spacewatch || 
|- id="2003 SA25" bgcolor=#E9E9E9
| 0 ||  || MBA-M || 16.3 || 1.6 km || multiple || 2003–2021 || 07 Jan 2021 || 284 || align=left | Disc.: Spacewatch || 
|- id="2003 SH27" bgcolor=#E9E9E9
| 2 ||  || MBA-M || 18.1 || 1.0 km || multiple || 2003–2012 || 03 Nov 2012 || 30 || align=left | Disc.: LINEAR || 
|- id="2003 SC28" bgcolor=#d6d6d6
| 0 ||  || MBA-O || 16.3 || 3.1 km || multiple || 2001–2021 || 09 Jan 2021 || 83 || align=left | Disc.: NEAT || 
|- id="2003 SF28" bgcolor=#d6d6d6
| 1 ||  || MBA-O || 16.6 || 2.7 km || multiple || 2003–2020 || 14 Dec 2020 || 77 || align=left | Disc.: NEAT || 
|- id="2003 SG28" bgcolor=#d6d6d6
| 0 ||  || MBA-O || 16.8 || 2.4 km || multiple || 2003–2020 || 23 Jan 2020 || 49 || align=left | Disc.: NEAT || 
|- id="2003 ST28" bgcolor=#d6d6d6
| 0 ||  || MBA-O || 16.91 || 2.3 km || multiple || 2003–2021 || 17 Apr 2021 || 81 || align=left | Disc.: NEAT || 
|- id="2003 SF29" bgcolor=#fefefe
| 0 ||  || MBA-I || 18.43 || data-sort-value="0.61" | 610 m || multiple || 2003–2022 || 25 Jan 2022 || 61 || align=left | Disc.: NEAT || 
|- id="2003 SH29" bgcolor=#d6d6d6
| 0 ||  || MBA-O || 15.85 || 3.8 km || multiple || 2003–2022 || 07 Jan 2022 || 352 || align=left | Disc.: NEAT || 
|- id="2003 SO29" bgcolor=#E9E9E9
| 0 ||  || MBA-M || 17.9 || data-sort-value="0.78" | 780 m || multiple || 2003–2020 || 18 Dec 2020 || 41 || align=left | Disc.: NEAT || 
|- id="2003 SP31" bgcolor=#d6d6d6
| 0 ||  || MBA-O || 16.4 || 2.9 km || multiple || 2003–2020 || 23 Dec 2020 || 118 || align=left | Disc.: SpacewatchAlt.: 2014 WP391 || 
|- id="2003 SB32" bgcolor=#FA8072
| 0 ||  || MCA || 18.8 || data-sort-value="0.52" | 520 m || multiple || 2003–2019 || 27 Sep 2019 || 111 || align=left | Disc.: NEATAlt.: 2013 YY27 || 
|- id="2003 SP33" bgcolor=#E9E9E9
| 0 ||  || MBA-M || 17.2 || 1.1 km || multiple || 2001–2021 || 12 Jan 2021 || 141 || align=left | Disc.: LPL/Spacewatch II || 
|- id="2003 SU34" bgcolor=#E9E9E9
| 0 ||  || MBA-M || 18.40 || data-sort-value="0.88" | 880 m || multiple || 2003–2021 || 28 Nov 2021 || 48 || align=left | Disc.: SpacewatchAlt.: 2012 UB80 || 
|- id="2003 SX34" bgcolor=#fefefe
| 0 ||  || MBA-I || 18.69 || data-sort-value="0.54" | 540 m || multiple || 2003–2022 || 06 Jan 2022 || 71 || align=left | Disc.: Spacewatch || 
|- id="2003 SD35" bgcolor=#d6d6d6
| 0 ||  || MBA-O || 16.8 || 2.4 km || multiple || 2003–2021 || 16 Jan 2021 || 119 || align=left | Disc.: SpacewatchAlt.: 2014 RU42 || 
|- id="2003 SH35" bgcolor=#fefefe
| 0 ||  || HUN || 18.95 || data-sort-value="0.48" | 480 m || multiple || 2003–2021 || 08 Apr 2021 || 61 || align=left | Disc.: Spacewatch || 
|- id="2003 SJ35" bgcolor=#FA8072
| 3 ||  || MCA || 18.7 || data-sort-value="0.54" | 540 m || multiple || 2003–2007 || 17 Nov 2007 || 46 || align=left | Disc.: NEATAlt.: 2007 TJ64 || 
|- id="2003 SQ35" bgcolor=#FA8072
| 0 ||  || HUN || 18.9 || data-sort-value="0.49" | 490 m || multiple || 2003–2019 || 07 Nov 2019 || 56 || align=left | Disc.: CINEOSAlt.: 2011 UR108, 2015 EX72, 2016 PU39 || 
|- id="2003 SH36" bgcolor=#FA8072
| 2 ||  || MCA || 18.9 || data-sort-value="0.49" | 490 m || multiple || 2003–2019 || 05 Feb 2019 || 96 || align=left | Disc.: NEAT || 
|- id="2003 SK36" bgcolor=#FFC2E0
| 6 ||  || AMO || 21.7 || data-sort-value="0.16" | 160 m || single || 36 days || 25 Oct 2003 || 34 || align=left | Disc.: NEAT || 
|- id="2003 SL36" bgcolor=#FFC2E0
| 8 ||  || APO || 26.4 || data-sort-value="0.019" | 19 m || single || 8 days || 26 Sep 2003 || 27 || align=left | Disc.: LONEOS || 
|- id="2003 SB41" bgcolor=#fefefe
| 0 ||  || MBA-I || 17.8 || data-sort-value="0.82" | 820 m || multiple || 2003–2021 || 08 Jan 2021 || 172 || align=left | Disc.: NEAT || 
|- id="2003 SV41" bgcolor=#E9E9E9
| 0 ||  || MBA-M || 17.2 || 1.1 km || multiple || 2003–2021 || 03 Jan 2021 || 97 || align=left | Disc.: LINEAR || 
|- id="2003 SC42" bgcolor=#fefefe
| 2 ||  || MBA-I || 18.2 || data-sort-value="0.68" | 680 m || multiple || 2003–2020 || 20 Jan 2020 || 82 || align=left | Disc.: NEATAlt.: 2007 UP8 || 
|- id="2003 SK42" bgcolor=#fefefe
| 1 ||  || HUN || 18.9 || data-sort-value="0.49" | 490 m || multiple || 2003–2020 || 11 Jul 2020 || 69 || align=left | Disc.: LPL/Spacewatch IIAlt.: 2017 FX33 || 
|- id="2003 SE44" bgcolor=#E9E9E9
| 0 ||  || MBA-M || 17.3 || 1.5 km || multiple || 2003–2020 || 15 Dec 2020 || 285 || align=left | Disc.: LONEOS || 
|- id="2003 SN47" bgcolor=#FA8072
| 1 ||  || MCA || 18.2 || data-sort-value="0.68" | 680 m || multiple || 2003–2021 || 06 Jan 2021 || 120 || align=left | Disc.: Kvistaberg Obs. || 
|- id="2003 SG48" bgcolor=#E9E9E9
| – ||  || MBA-M || 18.1 || 1.3 km || single || 33 days || 20 Oct 2003 || 19 || align=left | Disc.: NEAT || 
|- id="2003 SK48" bgcolor=#fefefe
| 0 ||  || MBA-I || 17.38 || data-sort-value="0.99" | 990 m || multiple || 2003–2021 || 14 May 2021 || 187 || align=left | Disc.: NEAT || 
|- id="2003 ST48" bgcolor=#E9E9E9
| 0 ||  || MBA-M || 17.3 || 1.0 km || multiple || 2000–2021 || 11 Jan 2021 || 67 || align=left | Disc.: NEATAdded on 17 January 2021 || 
|- id="2003 SZ48" bgcolor=#E9E9E9
| 2 ||  || MBA-M || 17.9 || data-sort-value="0.78" | 780 m || multiple || 2003–2020 || 10 Dec 2020 || 48 || align=left | Disc.: NEAT || 
|- id="2003 SH52" bgcolor=#d6d6d6
| 0 ||  || MBA-O || 16.5 || 2.8 km || multiple || 2003–2021 || 15 Jan 2021 || 157 || align=left | Disc.: NEATAlt.: 2014 QU384 || 
|- id="2003 SP53" bgcolor=#d6d6d6
| 1 ||  || MBA-O || 17.1 || 2.1 km || multiple || 2003–2020 || 13 Sep 2020 || 41 || align=left | Disc.: Spacewatch || 
|- id="2003 SQ53" bgcolor=#E9E9E9
| 1 ||  || MBA-M || 17.9 || data-sort-value="0.78" | 780 m || multiple || 2003–2020 || 07 Dec 2020 || 31 || align=left | Disc.: SpacewatchAdded on 11 May 2021Alt.: 2020 TG45 || 
|- id="2003 SR53" bgcolor=#E9E9E9
| 0 ||  || MBA-M || 17.9 || 1.1 km || multiple || 2003–2020 || 14 Nov 2020 || 80 || align=left | Disc.: Spacewatch || 
|- id="2003 SE54" bgcolor=#E9E9E9
| 1 ||  || MBA-M || 17.4 || 1.8 km || multiple || 2003–2018 || 07 Jan 2018 || 71 || align=left | Disc.: LONEOS || 
|- id="2003 SP54" bgcolor=#E9E9E9
| 2 ||  || MBA-M || 17.8 || 1.5 km || multiple || 2003–2017 || 16 Dec 2017 || 80 || align=left | Disc.: LONEOSAlt.: 2008 WX69 || 
|- id="2003 SE55" bgcolor=#E9E9E9
| 0 ||  || MBA-M || 17.52 || 1.7 km || multiple || 2003–2021 || 31 Oct 2021 || 103 || align=left | Disc.: LONEOS || 
|- id="2003 SK56" bgcolor=#FA8072
| 2 ||  || MCA || 18.9 || data-sort-value="0.49" | 490 m || multiple || 2003–2019 || 03 Jul 2019 || 35 || align=left | Disc.: LONEOS || 
|- id="2003 SN56" bgcolor=#fefefe
| 3 ||  || MBA-I || 17.8 || data-sort-value="0.82" | 820 m || multiple || 2003–2016 || 03 Jan 2016 || 42 || align=left | Disc.: LONEOSAlt.: 2003 SN307, 2011 WS62 || 
|- id="2003 SM58" bgcolor=#E9E9E9
| 0 ||  || MBA-M || 16.9 || 1.2 km || multiple || 1999–2020 || 30 Jul 2020 || 76 || align=left | Disc.: LINEARAlt.: 1999 TJ207 || 
|- id="2003 SB62" bgcolor=#E9E9E9
| 0 ||  || MBA-M || 17.28 || 1.5 km || multiple || 2003–2022 || 21 Jan 2022 || 114 || align=left | Disc.: LINEAR || 
|- id="2003 SH62" bgcolor=#fefefe
| 0 ||  || MBA-I || 18.1 || data-sort-value="0.71" | 710 m || multiple || 2003–2020 || 22 Dec 2020 || 119 || align=left | Disc.: LINEARAlt.: 2016 TN5 || 
|- id="2003 SR62" bgcolor=#d6d6d6
| 0 ||  || MBA-O || 17.0 || 2.2 km || multiple || 2003–2019 || 25 Oct 2019 || 41 || align=left | Disc.: Spacewatch || 
|- id="2003 SK63" bgcolor=#E9E9E9
| 1 ||  || MBA-M || 18.8 || data-sort-value="0.73" | 730 m || multiple || 2003–2020 || 14 Oct 2020 || 32 || align=left | Disc.: SpacewatchAdded on 11 May 2021Alt.: 2016 WM32 || 
|- id="2003 SP63" bgcolor=#E9E9E9
| 0 ||  || MBA-M || 17.57 || 1.7 km || multiple || 2003–2021 || 08 Nov 2021 || 66 || align=left | Disc.: SpacewatchAdded on 5 November 2021Alt.: 2021 RM11 || 
|- id="2003 SQ63" bgcolor=#E9E9E9
| 0 ||  || MBA-M || 17.97 || 1.1 km || multiple || 2003–2021 || 27 Nov 2021 || 36 || align=left | Disc.: SpacewatchAdded on 19 October 2020 || 
|- id="2003 SB68" bgcolor=#fefefe
| 0 ||  || HUN || 18.40 || data-sort-value="0.62" | 620 m || multiple || 2002–2021 || 09 Apr 2021 || 55 || align=left | Disc.: SpacewatchAlt.: 2013 GX22 || 
|- id="2003 SE68" bgcolor=#E9E9E9
| 1 ||  || MBA-M || 18.27 || 1.2 km || multiple || 2003–2021 || 19 Nov 2021 || 66 || align=left | Disc.: Spacewatch || 
|- id="2003 SL68" bgcolor=#E9E9E9
| – ||  || MBA-M || 18.3 || data-sort-value="0.65" | 650 m || single || 12 days || 29 Sep 2003 || 12 || align=left | Disc.: Spacewatch || 
|- id="2003 SM68" bgcolor=#FA8072
| – ||  || MCA || 19.9 || data-sort-value="0.31" | 310 m || single || 36 days || 23 Oct 2003 || 14 || align=left | Disc.: Spacewatch || 
|- id="2003 SN68" bgcolor=#d6d6d6
| 0 ||  || MBA-O || 17.3 || 1.9 km || multiple || 2003–2019 || 05 Nov 2019 || 46 || align=left | Disc.: Spacewatch || 
|- id="2003 SV68" bgcolor=#E9E9E9
| 1 ||  || MBA-M || 18.96 || data-sort-value="0.90" | 900 m || multiple || 2003–2021 || 04 Oct 2021 || 49 || align=left | Disc.: SpacewatchAlt.: 2003 SF366 || 
|- id="2003 SA69" bgcolor=#E9E9E9
| 0 ||  || MBA-M || 17.71 || 1.6 km || multiple || 2003–2021 || 28 Nov 2021 || 113 || align=left | Disc.: Spacewatch || 
|- id="2003 SX70" bgcolor=#FA8072
| 0 ||  || MCA || 18.45 || data-sort-value="0.61" | 610 m || multiple || 2003–2021 || 11 Oct 2021 || 56 || align=left | Disc.: SpacewatchAlt.: 2008 DJ70, 2014 WF370 || 
|- id="2003 SM71" bgcolor=#E9E9E9
| 1 ||  || MBA-M || 18.1 || 1.0 km || multiple || 2003–2020 || 16 Dec 2020 || 61 || align=left | Disc.: Spacewatch || 
|- id="2003 SO71" bgcolor=#E9E9E9
| 0 ||  || MBA-M || 16.8 || 1.3 km || multiple || 2003–2020 || 11 Dec 2020 || 96 || align=left | Disc.: SpacewatchAlt.: 2014 DJ127 || 
|- id="2003 SM72" bgcolor=#fefefe
| 1 ||  || MBA-I || 19.1 || data-sort-value="0.45" | 450 m || multiple || 2003–2020 || 11 Oct 2020 || 53 || align=left | Disc.: LPL/Spacewatch II || 
|- id="2003 SO72" bgcolor=#fefefe
| 0 ||  || MBA-I || 18.94 || data-sort-value="0.48" | 480 m || multiple || 2003–2021 || 03 Oct 2021 || 58 || align=left | Disc.: LPL/Spacewatch IIAlt.: 2014 TW60 || 
|- id="2003 SR72" bgcolor=#d6d6d6
| 1 ||  || HIL || 16.98 || 2.2 km || multiple || 2003–2019 || 25 Nov 2019 || 41 || align=left | Disc.: LPL/Spacewatch II || 
|- id="2003 SS72" bgcolor=#E9E9E9
| 0 ||  || MBA-M || 17.0 || 1.7 km || multiple || 2001–2020 || 15 Sep 2020 || 44 || align=left | Disc.: LPL/Spacewatch II || 
|- id="2003 SW72" bgcolor=#E9E9E9
| 0 ||  || MBA-M || 18.32 || 1.2 km || multiple || 2003–2021 || 06 Nov 2021 || 58 || align=left | Disc.: LPL/Spacewatch II || 
|- id="2003 SB73" bgcolor=#fefefe
| 1 ||  || MBA-I || 17.9 || data-sort-value="0.78" | 780 m || multiple || 2003–2018 || 10 Mar 2018 || 46 || align=left | Disc.: Spacewatch || 
|- id="2003 SW73" bgcolor=#fefefe
| 0 ||  || MBA-I || 18.1 || data-sort-value="0.71" | 710 m || multiple || 2002–2021 || 18 Jan 2021 || 123 || align=left | Disc.: LPL/Spacewatch IIAlt.: 2003 SS239, 2006 QS151 || 
|- id="2003 SH74" bgcolor=#fefefe
| 3 ||  || MBA-I || 18.8 || data-sort-value="0.52" | 520 m || multiple || 2003–2014 || 17 Oct 2014 || 25 || align=left | Disc.: SpacewatchAlt.: 2014 QF18 || 
|- id="2003 ST74" bgcolor=#fefefe
| 1 ||  || MBA-I || 17.1 || 1.1 km || multiple || 1999–2021 || 12 Jan 2021 || 72 || align=left | Disc.: SpacewatchAlt.: 2010 NK98 || 
|- id="2003 SX74" bgcolor=#fefefe
| 1 ||  || MBA-I || 19.4 || data-sort-value="0.39" | 390 m || multiple || 2003–2020 || 07 Dec 2020 || 35 || align=left | Disc.: Spacewatch || 
|- id="2003 SZ74" bgcolor=#d6d6d6
| 0 ||  || MBA-O || 16.94 || 2.3 km || multiple || 2003–2021 || 12 Jun 2021 || 65 || align=left | Disc.: Spacewatch || 
|- id="2003 SB75" bgcolor=#E9E9E9
| 0 ||  || MBA-M || 18.1 || 1.0 km || multiple || 2003–2016 || 08 Oct 2016 || 35 || align=left | Disc.: Spacewatch || 
|- id="2003 SD75" bgcolor=#FA8072
| 0 ||  || MCA || 20.62 || data-sort-value="0.22" | 220 m || multiple || 2003–2019 || 03 Dec 2019 || 58 || align=left | Disc.: Spacewatch || 
|- id="2003 SJ76" bgcolor=#fefefe
| 1 ||  || MBA-I || 19.40 || data-sort-value="0.39" | 390 m || multiple || 2003–2022 || 25 Jan 2022 || 57 || align=left | Disc.: LPL/Spacewatch II || 
|- id="2003 SW76" bgcolor=#d6d6d6
| 0 ||  || MBA-O || 16.6 || 2.7 km || multiple || 1998–2021 || 10 Jan 2021 || 141 || align=left | Disc.: LPL/Spacewatch IIAlt.: 2010 CL246 || 
|- id="2003 SE77" bgcolor=#E9E9E9
| 0 ||  || MBA-M || 17.92 || 1.5 km || multiple || 2003–2021 || 25 Sep 2021 || 51 || align=left | Disc.: Spacewatch || 
|- id="2003 SF77" bgcolor=#E9E9E9
| 0 ||  = (615457) || MBA-M || 17.22 || 1.1 km || multiple || 2002–2022 || 27 Jan 2022 || 131 || align=left | Disc.: SpacewatchAlt.: 2011 UT272, 2015 RG103 || 
|- id="2003 SN78" bgcolor=#fefefe
| 0 ||  || MBA-I || 17.9 || data-sort-value="0.78" | 780 m || multiple || 2003–2021 || 18 Jan 2021 || 148 || align=left | Disc.: SpacewatchAlt.: 2006 PJ38 || 
|- id="2003 SR78" bgcolor=#E9E9E9
| 1 ||  || MBA-M || 18.0 || 1.1 km || multiple || 2003–2021 || 11 Jan 2021 || 97 || align=left | Disc.: Spacewatch || 
|- id="2003 SZ78" bgcolor=#E9E9E9
| 0 ||  || MBA-M || 17.04 || 1.2 km || multiple || 2003–2022 || 27 Jan 2022 || 142 || align=left | Disc.: SpacewatchAlt.: 2007 RE15, 2010 LB89, 2014 ER89, 2015 PT1 || 
|- id="2003 SO79" bgcolor=#d6d6d6
| 0 ||  || HIL || 14.84 || 6.0 km || multiple || 2003–2021 || 01 May 2021 || 311 || align=left | Disc.: Spacewatch || 
|- id="2003 SB80" bgcolor=#E9E9E9
| 0 ||  || MBA-M || 17.8 || data-sort-value="0.82" | 820 m || multiple || 2003–2020 || 22 Dec 2020 || 50 || align=left | Disc.: SpacewatchAlt.: 2007 TA189 || 
|- id="2003 SY80" bgcolor=#fefefe
| 0 ||  || MBA-I || 18.88 || data-sort-value="0.50" | 500 m || multiple || 2003–2021 || 24 Oct 2021 || 64 || align=left | Disc.: SpacewatchAlt.: 2014 WC150 || 
|- id="2003 SH81" bgcolor=#fefefe
| 0 ||  || MBA-I || 18.0 || data-sort-value="0.75" | 750 m || multiple || 2003–2020 || 18 Aug 2020 || 101 || align=left | Disc.: Spacewatch || 
|- id="2003 SL81" bgcolor=#E9E9E9
| 0 ||  || MBA-M || 17.05 || 2.2 km || multiple || 2003–2022 || 05 Jan 2022 || 116 || align=left | Disc.: AMOSAlt.: 2012 TX318 || 
|- id="2003 SL83" bgcolor=#d6d6d6
| 0 ||  || MBA-O || 16.86 || 2.4 km || multiple || 2003–2022 || 25 Jan 2022 || 127 || align=left | Disc.: SpacewatchAlt.: 2010 CF228 || 
|- id="2003 SQ83" bgcolor=#d6d6d6
| 0 ||  || MBA-O || 17.36 || 2.5 km || multiple || 2003–2022 || 27 Jan 2022 || 99 || align=left | Disc.: Spacewatch || 
|- id="2003 ST83" bgcolor=#E9E9E9
| 0 ||  || MBA-M || 18.1 || 1.0 km || multiple || 2001–2021 || 06 Jan 2021 || 162 || align=left | Disc.: NEATAlt.: 2016 QJ97 || 
|- id="2003 SC84" bgcolor=#FA8072
| 1 ||  || MCA || 18.4 || data-sort-value="0.62" | 620 m || multiple || 2003–2020 || 11 Jun 2020 || 121 || align=left | Disc.: LINEARAlt.: 2010 LD109 || 
|- id="2003 SH84" bgcolor=#FFC2E0
| 5 ||  || AMO || 23.1 || data-sort-value="0.085" | 85 m || single || 93 days || 21 Dec 2003 || 32 || align=left | Disc.: Spacewatch || 
|- id="2003 SK84" bgcolor=#FFC2E0
| 2 ||  || APO || 21.2 || data-sort-value="0.20" | 200 m || multiple || 2003–2011 || 24 Sep 2011 || 100 || align=left | Disc.: NEATPotentially hazardous object || 
|- id="2003 SM84" bgcolor=#FFC2E0
| 0 ||  || AMO || 23.02 || data-sort-value="0.088" | 88 m || multiple || 2003–2021 || 17 Dec 2021 || 108 || align=left | Disc.: LINEAR || 
|- id="2003 SN84" bgcolor=#FA8072
| 2 ||  || MCA || 18.0 || data-sort-value="0.75" | 750 m || multiple || 2003–2021 || 10 Feb 2021 || 47 || align=left | Disc.: LINEARAlt.: 2021 BV9 || 
|- id="2003 SR84" bgcolor=#FFC2E0
| 5 ||  || APO || 26.0 || data-sort-value="0.022" | 22 m || single || 7 days || 27 Sep 2003 || 281 || align=left | Disc.: NEAT || 
|- id="2003 SS84" bgcolor=#FFC2E0
| 0 ||  || APO || 21.8 || data-sort-value="0.16" | 160 m || multiple || 2003–2020 || 22 Mar 2020 || 255 || align=left | Disc.: LINEARPotentially hazardous object || 
|- id="2003 SU84" bgcolor=#FFC2E0
| 2 ||  || APO || 22.1 || data-sort-value="0.14" | 140 m || multiple || 2003–2014 || 23 Sep 2014 || 55 || align=left | Disc.: LINEAR || 
|- id="2003 SW84" bgcolor=#FA8072
| 0 ||  || MCA || 19.43 || data-sort-value="0.39" | 390 m || multiple || 2003–2022 || 25 Jan 2022 || 136 || align=left | Disc.: NEAT || 
|- id="2003 SX84" bgcolor=#FA8072
| 0 ||  || MCA || 17.91 || data-sort-value="0.78" | 780 m || multiple || 2003–2021 || 30 Aug 2021 || 211 || align=left | Disc.: AMOS || 
|- id="2003 SZ84" bgcolor=#FA8072
| 1 ||  || MCA || 18.5 || data-sort-value="0.59" | 590 m || multiple || 2003–2019 || 02 Jun 2019 || 147 || align=left | Disc.: NEATAlt.: 2010 TA || 
|- id="2003 SA85" bgcolor=#FFC2E0
| 6 ||  || AMO || 21.6 || data-sort-value="0.17" | 170 m || single || 37 days || 28 Oct 2003 || 138 || align=left | Disc.: NEAT || 
|- id="2003 SB85" bgcolor=#FA8072
| 1 ||  || MCA || 18.3 || data-sort-value="0.92" | 920 m || multiple || 2003–2017 || 18 Mar 2017 || 157 || align=left | Disc.: LINEAR || 
|- id="2003 SG86" bgcolor=#d6d6d6
| 0 ||  || MBA-O || 16.0 || 3.5 km || multiple || 2003–2020 || 22 Nov 2020 || 172 || align=left | Disc.: NEAT || 
|- id="2003 SZ87" bgcolor=#E9E9E9
| 0 ||  || MBA-M || 17.94 || 1.4 km || multiple || 2003–2021 || 31 Oct 2021 || 53 || align=left | Disc.: CINEOS || 
|- id="2003 SP88" bgcolor=#d6d6d6
| 1 ||  || MBA-O || 16.7 || 2.5 km || multiple || 2003–2016 || 04 Jan 2016 || 66 || align=left | Disc.: LONEOSAlt.: 2014 QC408 || 
|- id="2003 SK89" bgcolor=#d6d6d6
| 1 ||  || MBA-O || 17.2 || 2.0 km || multiple || 2003–2020 || 21 Mar 2020 || 120 || align=left | Disc.: NEAT || 
|- id="2003 SN89" bgcolor=#d6d6d6
| 0 ||  || MBA-O || 16.4 || 2.9 km || multiple || 2003–2020 || 12 Dec 2020 || 111 || align=left | Disc.: NEATAlt.: 2009 WM160 || 
|- id="2003 SC90" bgcolor=#d6d6d6
| 0 ||  || MBA-O || 16.49 || 2.8 km || multiple || 2003–2021 || 03 Apr 2021 || 146 || align=left | Disc.: NEATAlt.: 2016 EA164 || 
|- id="2003 SD90" bgcolor=#E9E9E9
| 0 ||  || MBA-M || 17.4 || data-sort-value="0.98" | 980 m || multiple || 2003–2021 || 03 Jan 2021 || 50 || align=left | Disc.: NEAT || 
|- id="2003 SK91" bgcolor=#fefefe
| 2 ||  || MBA-I || 18.3 || data-sort-value="0.65" | 650 m || multiple || 2003–2014 || 26 Nov 2014 || 96 || align=left | Disc.: NEATAlt.: 2014 RF45 || 
|- id="2003 SM91" bgcolor=#fefefe
| 1 ||  || MBA-I || 19.23 || data-sort-value="0.42" | 420 m || multiple || 2003–2021 || 29 Nov 2021 || 36 || align=left | Disc.: NEAT || 
|- id="2003 SP91" bgcolor=#E9E9E9
| 0 ||  || MBA-M || 16.98 || 2.2 km || multiple || 2003–2021 || 27 Nov 2021 || 233 || align=left | Disc.: NEAT || 
|- id="2003 SE92" bgcolor=#E9E9E9
| 0 ||  || MBA-M || 17.5 || 1.3 km || multiple || 2003–2021 || 05 Jan 2021 || 188 || align=left | Disc.: Spacewatch || 
|- id="2003 SR92" bgcolor=#E9E9E9
| 1 ||  || MBA-M || 17.8 || data-sort-value="0.82" | 820 m || multiple || 2003–2017 || 31 Jan 2017 || 68 || align=left | Disc.: LPL/Spacewatch IIAlt.: 2014 HC107 || 
|- id="2003 SP93" bgcolor=#d6d6d6
| 0 ||  || MBA-O || 17.14 || 2.1 km || multiple || 2003–2021 || 10 Apr 2021 || 132 || align=left | Disc.: NEATAlt.: 2008 QE33 || 
|- id="2003 SV94" bgcolor=#d6d6d6
| 0 ||  || MBA-O || 17.24 || 2.7 km || multiple || 2003–2021 || 30 Nov 2021 || 64 || align=left | Disc.: SpacewatchAlt.: 2010 BW59 || 
|- id="2003 SZ94" bgcolor=#E9E9E9
| 0 ||  || MBA-M || 18.07 || 1.4 km || multiple || 2003–2021 || 07 Nov 2021 || 62 || align=left | Disc.: SpacewatchAdded on 5 November 2021 || 
|- id="2003 SD95" bgcolor=#fefefe
| 0 ||  || MBA-I || 17.7 || data-sort-value="0.86" | 860 m || multiple || 2003–2020 || 22 Mar 2020 || 69 || align=left | Disc.: Spacewatch || 
|- id="2003 SZ95" bgcolor=#fefefe
| 0 ||  || MBA-I || 18.41 || data-sort-value="0.62" | 620 m || multiple || 2003–2021 || 09 Dec 2021 || 85 || align=left | Disc.: NEATAlt.: 2003 SU313 || 
|- id="2003 SB96" bgcolor=#E9E9E9
| 0 ||  || MBA-M || 17.3 || 1.5 km || multiple || 2003–2020 || 06 Dec 2020 || 157 || align=left | Disc.: NEAT || 
|- id="2003 SM96" bgcolor=#fefefe
| – ||  || MBA-I || 18.8 || data-sort-value="0.52" | 520 m || single || 30 days || 19 Oct 2003 || 10 || align=left | Disc.: Spacewatch || 
|- id="2003 SX96" bgcolor=#E9E9E9
| 0 ||  || MBA-M || 17.7 || 1.2 km || multiple || 2003–2020 || 16 Oct 2020 || 122 || align=left | Disc.: SpacewatchAlt.: 2015 KH140 || 
|- id="2003 SZ97" bgcolor=#E9E9E9
| 0 ||  || MBA-M || 17.00 || 1.2 km || multiple || 2003–2022 || 26 Jan 2022 || 159 || align=left | Disc.: NEAT || 
|- id="2003 SV100" bgcolor=#E9E9E9
| – ||  || MBA-M || 20.9 || data-sort-value="0.20" | 200 m || single || 2 days || 22 Sep 2003 || 9 || align=left | Disc.: LPL/Spacewatch II || 
|- id="2003 SO101" bgcolor=#E9E9E9
| 0 ||  || MBA-M || 16.9 || 1.8 km || multiple || 2003–2021 || 11 Jan 2021 || 243 || align=left | Disc.: NEAT || 
|- id="2003 SH102" bgcolor=#E9E9E9
| 0 ||  || MBA-M || 17.24 || 2.0 km || multiple || 2003–2021 || 26 Oct 2021 || 103 || align=left | Disc.: LINEARAlt.: 2012 QC2 || 
|- id="2003 SK102" bgcolor=#E9E9E9
| 0 ||  || MBA-M || 16.2 || 3.2 km || multiple || 2003–2020 || 11 Apr 2020 || 121 || align=left | Disc.: SpacewatchAlt.: 2012 PJ7, 2015 FL55 || 
|- id="2003 ST102" bgcolor=#E9E9E9
| 0 ||  || MBA-M || 17.7 || data-sort-value="0.86" | 860 m || multiple || 2003–2020 || 16 Dec 2020 || 55 || align=left | Disc.: LINEAR || 
|- id="2003 SC104" bgcolor=#d6d6d6
| 0 ||  || MBA-O || 15.79 || 3.9 km || multiple || 2003–2021 || 13 Feb 2021 || 184 || align=left | Disc.: NEATAlt.: 2003 SC333, 2011 SJ272 || 
|- id="2003 SV104" bgcolor=#E9E9E9
| 0 ||  || MBA-M || 17.4 || 1.4 km || multiple || 2003–2021 || 08 Jan 2021 || 100 || align=left | Disc.: LINEAR || 
|- id="2003 SE105" bgcolor=#fefefe
| 1 ||  || HUN || 18.2 || data-sort-value="0.68" | 680 m || multiple || 2003–2021 || 12 Jun 2021 || 211 || align=left | Disc.: NEATAlt.: 2011 SO23 || 
|- id="2003 SU106" bgcolor=#d6d6d6
| 0 ||  || MBA-O || 17.02 || 2.2 km || multiple || 2003–2021 || 02 Dec 2021 || 54 || align=left | Disc.: LPL/Spacewatch IIAdded on 24 December 2021 || 
|- id="2003 SU108" bgcolor=#fefefe
| 0 ||  || MBA-I || 17.9 || data-sort-value="0.78" | 780 m || multiple || 2003–2018 || 14 Dec 2018 || 99 || align=left | Disc.: NEAT || 
|- id="2003 SC109" bgcolor=#d6d6d6
| 0 ||  || MBA-O || 16.3 || 3.1 km || multiple || 2003–2021 || 06 Jan 2021 || 80 || align=left | Disc.: LPL/Spacewatch IIAlt.: 2009 WJ224, 2010 CN49 || 
|- id="2003 SD109" bgcolor=#E9E9E9
| 1 ||  || MBA-M || 17.94 || 1.4 km || multiple || 2003–2021 || 04 Oct 2021 || 43 || align=left | Disc.: LPL/Spacewatch II || 
|- id="2003 SF109" bgcolor=#d6d6d6
| 0 ||  || MBA-O || 16.3 || 3.1 km || multiple || 2003–2020 || 10 Nov 2020 || 87 || align=left | Disc.: LPL/Spacewatch IIAlt.: 2003 SR316, 2014 SZ49 || 
|- id="2003 SF111" bgcolor=#d6d6d6
| 0 ||  || MBA-O || 17.04 || 2.2 km || multiple || 2003–2021 || 30 Nov 2021 || 105 || align=left | Disc.: NEATAlt.: 2009 UC91 || 
|- id="2003 SK111" bgcolor=#d6d6d6
| 4 ||  || MBA-O || 17.7 || 1.6 km || single || 61 days || 19 Nov 2003 || 23 || align=left | Disc.: NEAT || 
|- id="2003 SO112" bgcolor=#fefefe
| 0 ||  || MBA-I || 18.76 || data-sort-value="0.53" | 530 m || multiple || 2003–2021 || 01 Jul 2021 || 53 || align=left | Disc.: SpacewatchAdded on 17 June 2021 || 
|- id="2003 ST112" bgcolor=#E9E9E9
| 0 ||  || MBA-M || 17.86 || data-sort-value="0.80" | 800 m || multiple || 2003–2020 || 09 Dec 2020 || 60 || align=left | Disc.: Spacewatch || 
|- id="2003 SH113" bgcolor=#fefefe
| 3 ||  || MBA-I || 18.7 || data-sort-value="0.54" | 540 m || multiple || 2003–2018 || 15 Nov 2018 || 23 || align=left | Disc.: SpacewatchAdded on 21 August 2021Alt.: 2014 SY296 || 
|- id="2003 SL113" bgcolor=#E9E9E9
| 1 ||  || MBA-M || 18.19 || 1.3 km || multiple || 2003–2021 || 31 Aug 2021 || 45 || align=left | Disc.: Spacewatch || 
|- id="2003 SN113" bgcolor=#d6d6d6
| 0 ||  || MBA-O || 17.0 || 2.2 km || multiple || 2003–2020 || 12 Dec 2020 || 96 || align=left | Disc.: Spacewatch || 
|- id="2003 SQ113" bgcolor=#d6d6d6
| 0 ||  || MBA-O || 17.23 || 2.0 km || multiple || 2003–2021 || 20 Apr 2021 || 69 || align=left | Disc.: Spacewatch || 
|- id="2003 SW113" bgcolor=#E9E9E9
| 0 ||  || MBA-M || 17.0 || 2.2 km || multiple || 2003–2020 || 15 Feb 2020 || 47 || align=left | Disc.: Spacewatch || 
|- id="2003 SM114" bgcolor=#E9E9E9
| – ||  || MBA-M || 19.6 || data-sort-value="0.67" | 670 m || single || 6 days || 22 Sep 2003 || 9 || align=left | Disc.: Spacewatch || 
|- id="2003 SS114" bgcolor=#fefefe
| – ||  || MBA-I || 20.2 || data-sort-value="0.27" | 270 m || single || 6 days || 22 Sep 2003 || 9 || align=left | Disc.: LPL/Spacewatch II || 
|- id="2003 ST114" bgcolor=#d6d6d6
| 0 ||  || MBA-O || 16.3 || 3.1 km || multiple || 2003–2020 || 16 Nov 2020 || 95 || align=left | Disc.: LPL/Spacewatch II || 
|- id="2003 SV114" bgcolor=#E9E9E9
| 2 ||  || MBA-M || 18.6 || data-sort-value="0.57" | 570 m || multiple || 2003–2019 || 03 Oct 2019 || 60 || align=left | Disc.: LPL/Spacewatch IIAlt.: 2011 SP266 || 
|- id="2003 SF115" bgcolor=#d6d6d6
| 0 ||  || MBA-O || 16.5 || 2.8 km || multiple || 1996–2019 || 27 Oct 2019 || 86 || align=left | Disc.: LPL/Spacewatch II || 
|- id="2003 SJ115" bgcolor=#fefefe
| 0 ||  || MBA-I || 17.30 || 1.0 km || multiple || 2003–2021 || 22 Sep 2021 || 151 || align=left | Disc.: NEATAlt.: 2011 YE50 || 
|- id="2003 SM115" bgcolor=#fefefe
| 1 ||  || MBA-I || 18.80 || data-sort-value="0.52" | 520 m || multiple || 2003–2021 || 09 Nov 2021 || 51 || align=left | Disc.: LPL/Spacewatch IIAdded on 5 November 2021 || 
|- id="2003 SO115" bgcolor=#E9E9E9
| 0 ||  || MBA-M || 17.8 || 1.2 km || multiple || 2003–2020 || 16 Sep 2020 || 76 || align=left | Disc.: LPL/Spacewatch IIAlt.: 2012 UG18 || 
|- id="2003 SS115" bgcolor=#fefefe
| 1 ||  || MBA-I || 18.6 || data-sort-value="0.57" | 570 m || multiple || 2003–2021 || 02 Oct 2021 || 33 || align=left | Disc.: SpacewatchAdded on 5 November 2021Alt.: 2021 PT101 || 
|- id="2003 SR116" bgcolor=#d6d6d6
| 3 ||  || MBA-O || 17.7 || 1.6 km || multiple || 1998–2018 || 10 Oct 2018 || 28 || align=left | Disc.: Spacewatch || 
|- id="2003 SM118" bgcolor=#fefefe
| 0 ||  || MBA-I || 18.58 || data-sort-value="0.57" | 570 m || multiple || 2003–2021 || 03 Sep 2021 || 44 || align=left | Disc.: LPL/Spacewatch II || 
|- id="2003 SN118" bgcolor=#fefefe
| 0 ||  || MBA-I || 19.1 || data-sort-value="0.45" | 450 m || multiple || 2003–2021 || 30 May 2021 || 25 || align=left | Disc.: LPL/Spacewatch II || 
|- id="2003 SR118" bgcolor=#E9E9E9
| 0 ||  || MBA-M || 18.16 || 1.3 km || multiple || 2003–2021 || 10 Sep 2021 || 47 || align=left | Disc.: LPL/Spacewatch II || 
|- id="2003 SL119" bgcolor=#fefefe
| 0 ||  || MBA-I || 17.77 || data-sort-value="0.83" | 830 m || multiple || 2003–2021 || 21 Nov 2021 || 304 || align=left | Disc.: LONEOS || 
|- id="2003 SD120" bgcolor=#fefefe
| 0 ||  || MBA-I || 18.2 || data-sort-value="0.68" | 680 m || multiple || 2003–2021 || 05 Jan 2021 || 90 || align=left | Disc.: Spacewatch || 
|- id="2003 SK120" bgcolor=#E9E9E9
| 1 ||  || MBA-M || 17.5 || 1.8 km || multiple || 2003–2017 || 21 Nov 2017 || 44 || align=left | Disc.: Spacewatch || 
|- id="2003 SR121" bgcolor=#d6d6d6
| 0 ||  || MBA-O || 15.6 || 4.2 km || multiple || 2003–2021 || 18 Jan 2021 || 240 || align=left | Disc.: Spacewatch || 
|- id="2003 ST122" bgcolor=#fefefe
| 2 ||  || MBA-I || 18.2 || data-sort-value="0.68" | 680 m || multiple || 2003–2020 || 11 Oct 2020 || 53 || align=left | Disc.: SpacewatchAdded on 19 October 2020Alt.: 2010 ON7 || 
|- id="2003 SW122" bgcolor=#E9E9E9
| 1 ||  || MBA-M || 19.15 || data-sort-value="0.82" | 820 m || multiple || 2003–2021 || 29 Nov 2021 || 43 || align=left | Disc.: NEATAdded on 24 December 2021 || 
|- id="2003 SX122" bgcolor=#d6d6d6
| 0 ||  || MBA-O || 16.6 || 2.7 km || multiple || 2003–2020 || 11 Dec 2020 || 110 || align=left | Disc.: NEATAlt.: 2014 UN49 || 
|- id="2003 SN123" bgcolor=#fefefe
| 2 ||  || MBA-I || 18.8 || data-sort-value="0.52" | 520 m || multiple || 2003–2019 || 01 Nov 2019 || 57 || align=left | Disc.: NEAT || 
|- id="2003 SQ123" bgcolor=#E9E9E9
| 2 ||  || MBA-M || 17.9 || 1.1 km || multiple || 2003–2020 || 16 Sep 2020 || 53 || align=left | Disc.: SpacewatchAlt.: 2016 UP61 || 
|- id="2003 SC124" bgcolor=#E9E9E9
| 0 ||  || MBA-M || 17.3 || 1.5 km || multiple || 2003–2021 || 17 Jan 2021 || 178 || align=left | Disc.: NEAT || 
|- id="2003 SQ124" bgcolor=#fefefe
| 0 ||  || MBA-I || 18.64 || data-sort-value="0.56" | 560 m || multiple || 1992–2021 || 10 Sep 2021 || 59 || align=left | Disc.: LPL/Spacewatch II || 
|- id="2003 SS124" bgcolor=#E9E9E9
| 1 ||  || MBA-M || 18.18 || 1.3 km || multiple || 2003–2021 || 28 Nov 2021 || 37 || align=left | Disc.: LPL/Spacewatch IIAlt.: 2012 TW280 || 
|- id="2003 SA125" bgcolor=#E9E9E9
| 0 ||  || MBA-M || 17.18 || 2.0 km || multiple || 2003–2021 || 04 Aug 2021 || 51 || align=left | Disc.: Spacewatch || 
|- id="2003 SB125" bgcolor=#fefefe
| 2 ||  || MBA-I || 19.0 || data-sort-value="0.47" | 470 m || multiple || 2003–2019 || 27 Nov 2019 || 104 || align=left | Disc.: Spacewatch || 
|- id="2003 SC125" bgcolor=#d6d6d6
| 0 ||  || MBA-O || 17.4 || 1.8 km || multiple || 2003–2020 || 08 Oct 2020 || 37 || align=left | Disc.: SpacewatchAdded on 17 January 2021 || 
|- id="2003 SD125" bgcolor=#E9E9E9
| – ||  || MBA-M || 17.8 || 1.5 km || single || 2 days || 21 Sep 2003 || 11 || align=left | Disc.: VATT || 
|- id="2003 SE125" bgcolor=#d6d6d6
| – ||  || MBA-O || 17.0 || 2.2 km || single || 2 days || 21 Sep 2003 || 13 || align=left | Disc.: VATT || 
|- id="2003 SD126" bgcolor=#d6d6d6
| 0 ||  || MBA-O || 16.67 || 2.6 km || multiple || 2003–2022 || 27 Jan 2022 || 144 || align=left | Disc.: VATTAlt.: 2010 DY61, 2014 WF309 || 
|- id="2003 SE126" bgcolor=#E9E9E9
| 3 ||  || MBA-M || 19.4 || data-sort-value="0.55" | 550 m || multiple || 2003–2020 || 14 Oct 2020 || 21 || align=left | Disc.: VATT || 
|- id="2003 ST126" bgcolor=#E9E9E9
| – ||  || MBA-M || 18.9 || data-sort-value="0.70" | 700 m || single || 10 days || 30 Sep 2003 || 20 || align=left | Disc.: KLENOT || 
|- id="2003 SA127" bgcolor=#E9E9E9
| 2 ||  || MBA-M || 18.1 || 1.0 km || multiple || 2003–2016 || 26 Oct 2016 || 41 || align=left | Disc.: Piszkéstető Stn. || 
|- id="2003 SC127" bgcolor=#d6d6d6
| 0 ||  || MBA-O || 16.1 || 3.4 km || multiple || 2003–2020 || 21 Oct 2020 || 128 || align=left | Disc.: Piszkéstető Stn.Alt.: 2014 QX216, 2015 TG232 || 
|- id="2003 SE127" bgcolor=#d6d6d6
| 0 ||  || MBA-O || 17.05 || 2.2 km || multiple || 2003–2022 || 27 Jan 2022 || 244 || align=left | Disc.: Piszkéstető Stn.Alt.: 2010 BQ33 || 
|- id="2003 SK127" bgcolor=#E9E9E9
| 0 ||  || MBA-M || 16.46 || 2.1 km || multiple || 2003–2022 || 26 Jan 2022 || 302 || align=left | Disc.: Piszkéstető Stn.Alt.: 2014 DR62 || 
|- id="2003 SL127" bgcolor=#d6d6d6
| 0 ||  || MBA-O || 17.50 || 1.8 km || multiple || 2003–2021 || 03 Apr 2021 || 66 || align=left | Disc.: Piszkéstető Stn.Alt.: 2016 GQ60 || 
|- id="2003 SQ127" bgcolor=#E9E9E9
| 0 ||  || MBA-M || 17.07 || 2.1 km || multiple || 2003–2019 || 26 Jan 2019 || 87 || align=left | Disc.: NEATAlt.: 2017 RY24 || 
|- id="2003 SV127" bgcolor=#fefefe
| 0 ||  || MBA-I || 18.05 || data-sort-value="0.73" | 730 m || multiple || 2003–2021 || 01 Nov 2021 || 125 || align=left | Disc.: LINEAR || 
|- id="2003 SQ128" bgcolor=#E9E9E9
| 0 ||  || MBA-M || 17.7 || 1.2 km || multiple || 2003–2021 || 11 Jan 2021 || 88 || align=left | Disc.: VATTAdded on 22 July 2020 || 
|- id="2003 SA129" bgcolor=#d6d6d6
| 0 ||  || MBA-O || 16.11 || 3.3 km || multiple || 2003–2022 || 27 Jan 2022 || 133 || align=left | Disc.: Piszkéstető Stn. || 
|- id="2003 SC130" bgcolor=#d6d6d6
| 0 ||  || MBA-O || 16.67 || 2.6 km || multiple || 2003–2022 || 09 Jan 2022 || 112 || align=left | Disc.: SpacewatchAdded on 17 January 2021Alt.: 2010 BN45 || 
|- id="2003 SG130" bgcolor=#fefefe
| 1 ||  || MBA-I || 17.85 || data-sort-value="0.80" | 800 m || multiple || 2003–2021 || 13 Apr 2021 || 35 || align=left | Disc.: Spacewatch || 
|- id="2003 SM130" bgcolor=#E9E9E9
| – ||  || MBA-M || 17.5 || data-sort-value="0.94" | 940 m || single || 33 days || 23 Oct 2003 || 20 || align=left | Disc.: LINEAR || 
|- id="2003 SV130" bgcolor=#E9E9E9
| 0 ||  || MBA-M || 17.0 || 1.2 km || multiple || 2003–2020 || 17 Dec 2020 || 149 || align=left | Disc.: Spacewatch || 
|- id="2003 SW130" bgcolor=#FFC2E0
| 7 ||  || ATE || 29.1 || data-sort-value="0.0054" | 5 m || single || 8 days || 28 Sep 2003 || 24 || align=left | Disc.: LPL/Spacewatch II || 
|- id="2003 SA131" bgcolor=#d6d6d6
| 0 ||  || MBA-O || 17.7 || 1.6 km || multiple || 2003–2019 || 31 Oct 2019 || 53 || align=left | Disc.: NEAT || 
|- id="2003 SA132" bgcolor=#d6d6d6
| 1 ||  || MBA-O || 17.2 || 2.0 km || multiple || 2003–2020 || 11 Oct 2020 || 46 || align=left | Disc.: LPL/Spacewatch IIAdded on 30 September 2021Alt.: 2014 OJ438 || 
|- id="2003 SX132" bgcolor=#E9E9E9
| 0 ||  || MBA-M || 17.33 || 1.4 km || multiple || 2003–2022 || 27 Jan 2022 || 112 || align=left | Disc.: Spacewatch || 
|- id="2003 SS134" bgcolor=#E9E9E9
| 0 ||  || MBA-M || 17.2 || 1.1 km || multiple || 2001–2021 || 10 Jan 2021 || 162 || align=left | Disc.: SpacewatchAlt.: 2005 GY189 || 
|- id="2003 SB135" bgcolor=#fefefe
| 0 ||  || MBA-I || 18.8 || data-sort-value="0.52" | 520 m || multiple || 2003–2020 || 01 Feb 2020 || 45 || align=left | Disc.: SpacewatchAdded on 22 July 2020 || 
|- id="2003 SM135" bgcolor=#fefefe
| 1 ||  || MBA-I || 18.7 || data-sort-value="0.54" | 540 m || multiple || 2003–2019 || 03 Apr 2019 || 29 || align=left | Disc.: Spacewatch || 
|- id="2003 SN135" bgcolor=#E9E9E9
| 0 ||  || MBA-M || 17.9 || 1.1 km || multiple || 2001–2021 || 30 Nov 2021 || 45 || align=left | Disc.: LPL/Spacewatch IIAdded on 24 December 2021 || 
|- id="2003 SO135" bgcolor=#fefefe
| – ||  || MBA-I || 20.2 || data-sort-value="0.27" | 270 m || single || 34 days || 23 Oct 2003 || 12 || align=left | Disc.: LPL/Spacewatch II || 
|- id="2003 SJ136" bgcolor=#E9E9E9
| 0 ||  || MBA-M || 16.7 || 2.5 km || multiple || 2001–2020 || 25 May 2020 || 135 || align=left | Disc.: CINEOSAlt.: 2016 LY24 || 
|- id="2003 SL136" bgcolor=#d6d6d6
| 0 ||  || MBA-O || 16.6 || 2.7 km || multiple || 2003–2021 || 18 Jan 2021 || 115 || align=left | Disc.: CINEOSAlt.: 2014 WX503, 2016 AE125 || 
|- id="2003 SZ136" bgcolor=#E9E9E9
| 0 ||  || MBA-M || 17.8 || 1.5 km || multiple || 2003–2017 || 27 Oct 2017 || 39 || align=left | Disc.: Spacewatch || 
|- id="2003 SA138" bgcolor=#E9E9E9
| 0 ||  || MBA-M || 17.80 || 1.2 km || multiple || 2003–2022 || 27 Jan 2022 || 124 || align=left | Disc.: CINEOS || 
|- id="2003 SE139" bgcolor=#d6d6d6
| 0 ||  || MBA-O || 16.9 || 2.3 km || multiple || 1992–2021 || 07 Jan 2021 || 209 || align=left | Disc.: LONEOS || 
|- id="2003 SS140" bgcolor=#FA8072
| 0 ||  || MCA || 18.3 || data-sort-value="0.65" | 650 m || multiple || 2003–2019 || 01 Aug 2019 || 77 || align=left | Disc.: NEAT || 
|- id="2003 SW140" bgcolor=#E9E9E9
| 0 ||  || MBA-M || 17.2 || 1.5 km || multiple || 2003–2016 || 25 Nov 2016 || 95 || align=left | Disc.: NEAT || 
|- id="2003 SC145" bgcolor=#E9E9E9
| 0 ||  || MBA-M || 16.46 || 2.8 km || multiple || 2003–2021 || 03 Dec 2021 || 216 || align=left | Disc.: AMOSAlt.: 2012 QA42 || 
|- id="2003 SF150" bgcolor=#E9E9E9
| 0 ||  || MBA-M || 17.4 || 1.4 km || multiple || 2003–2020 || 12 Sep 2020 || 165 || align=left | Disc.: LINEARAlt.: 2016 UL15 || 
|- id="2003 SS150" bgcolor=#E9E9E9
| 0 ||  || MBA-M || 16.7 || 1.9 km || multiple || 2003–2019 || 27 May 2019 || 101 || align=left | Disc.: LINEARAlt.: 2015 HK108 || 
|- id="2003 SA151" bgcolor=#fefefe
| 0 ||  || MBA-I || 17.75 || data-sort-value="0.84" | 840 m || multiple || 2002–2022 || 27 Jan 2022 || 134 || align=left | Disc.: LINEAR || 
|- id="2003 SU151" bgcolor=#E9E9E9
| 1 ||  || MBA-M || 17.4 || data-sort-value="0.98" | 980 m || multiple || 2003–2018 || 19 Mar 2018 || 46 || align=left | Disc.: NEAT || 
|- id="2003 SS152" bgcolor=#E9E9E9
| 1 ||  || MBA-M || 17.9 || 1.1 km || multiple || 2003–2020 || 17 Nov 2020 || 63 || align=left | Disc.: LONEOSAdded on 17 January 2021 || 
|- id="2003 SO153" bgcolor=#E9E9E9
| 1 ||  || MBA-M || 17.5 || 1.3 km || multiple || 2003–2020 || 06 Dec 2020 || 86 || align=left | Disc.: LONEOS || 
|- id="2003 SJ154" bgcolor=#FFC2E0
| 1 ||  || AMO || 18.9 || data-sort-value="0.59" | 590 m || multiple || 2003–2020 || 16 May 2020 || 120 || align=left | Disc.: LONEOSAlt.: 2010 TZ54 || 
|- id="2003 SA157" bgcolor=#d6d6d6
| 0 ||  = (319309) || MBA-O || 15.96 || 3.5 km || multiple || 1992-2022 || 06 Mar 2022 || 293 || align=left | Disc.: SpacewatchAlt.: 2001 FZ241, 2006 AR106, 2006 BR143, 2009 WR61  || 
|- id="2003 SD158" bgcolor=#fefefe
| – ||  || MBA-I || 19.8 || data-sort-value="0.33" | 330 m || single || 6 days || 27 Sep 2003 || 17 || align=left | Disc.: Piszkéstető Stn. || 
|- id="2003 SJ158" bgcolor=#d6d6d6
| 1 ||  || MBA-O || 16.6 || 2.7 km || multiple || 2003–2017 || 18 Mar 2017 || 86 || align=left | Disc.: LONEOS || 
|- id="2003 SL158" bgcolor=#E9E9E9
| 0 ||  || MBA-M || 17.00 || 1.7 km || multiple || 2003–2022 || 27 Jan 2022 || 209 || align=left | Disc.: AMOS || 
|- id="2003 SM158" bgcolor=#E9E9E9
| 0 ||  || MBA-M || 16.6 || 2.7 km || multiple || 2003–2020 || 16 May 2020 || 82 || align=left | Disc.: Spacewatch || 
|- id="2003 SS158" bgcolor=#fefefe
| 0 ||  || MBA-I || 17.57 || data-sort-value="0.91" | 910 m || multiple || 2003–2022 || 08 Jan 2022 || 266 || align=left | Disc.: LINEAR || 
|- id="2003 SV159" bgcolor=#FFC2E0
| 6 ||  || AMO || 22.9 || data-sort-value="0.093" | 93 m || single || 32 days || 24 Oct 2003 || 87 || align=left | Disc.: LINEAR || 
|- id="2003 SD161" bgcolor=#E9E9E9
| 0 ||  || MBA-M || 17.3 || 1.5 km || multiple || 2003–2021 || 17 Jan 2021 || 273 || align=left | Disc.: NEAT || 
|- id="2003 SN161" bgcolor=#FA8072
| 0 ||  || MCA || 18.81 || data-sort-value="0.51" | 510 m || multiple || 1999–2019 || 27 Sep 2019 || 55 || align=left | Disc.: SpacewatchAlt.: 2016 SW11 || 
|- id="2003 SU161" bgcolor=#fefefe
| 0 ||  || HUN || 18.3 || data-sort-value="0.65" | 650 m || multiple || 2003–2020 || 25 Dec 2020 || 90 || align=left | Disc.: NEAT || 
|- id="2003 SY163" bgcolor=#E9E9E9
| 0 ||  || MBA-M || 18.01 || 1.4 km || multiple || 2003–2021 || 27 Oct 2021 || 85 || align=left | Disc.: LONEOS || 
|- id="2003 SW165" bgcolor=#d6d6d6
| 0 ||  || MBA-O || 16.2 || 3.2 km || multiple || 2003–2021 || 15 Jan 2021 || 129 || align=left | Disc.: NEATAlt.: 2014 YJ40 || 
|- id="2003 SY165" bgcolor=#E9E9E9
| 3 ||  || MBA-M || 18.8 || data-sort-value="0.52" | 520 m || multiple || 2003–2021 || 17 Jan 2021 || 30 || align=left | Disc.: LONEOSAdded on 11 May 2021Alt.: 2020 YH12 || 
|- id="2003 SH166" bgcolor=#E9E9E9
| 0 ||  || MBA-M || 17.3 || 1.0 km || multiple || 2003–2021 || 14 Jan 2021 || 135 || align=left | Disc.: Spacewatch || 
|- id="2003 SL166" bgcolor=#E9E9E9
| – ||  || MBA-M || 19.1 || data-sort-value="0.45" | 450 m || single || 33 days || 24 Oct 2003 || 15 || align=left | Disc.: Spacewatch || 
|- id="2003 SN167" bgcolor=#fefefe
| 0 ||  || MBA-I || 18.10 || data-sort-value="0.71" | 710 m || multiple || 2003–2021 || 08 May 2021 || 73 || align=left | Disc.: SpacewatchAlt.: 2007 UF66 || 
|- id="2003 SS167" bgcolor=#d6d6d6
| 0 ||  || MBA-O || 16.3 || 3.1 km || multiple || 2003–2021 || 18 Jan 2021 || 99 || align=left | Disc.: SpacewatchAlt.: 2012 JR32 || 
|- id="2003 SL168" bgcolor=#fefefe
| 0 ||  || MBA-I || 18.0 || data-sort-value="0.75" | 750 m || multiple || 2003–2021 || 06 Jan 2021 || 160 || align=left | Disc.: AMOS || 
|- id="2003 SE170" bgcolor=#FA8072
| 2 ||  || MCA || 19.9 || data-sort-value="0.31" | 310 m || multiple || 2003–2019 || 03 Nov 2019 || 57 || align=left | Disc.: NEATAlt.: 2007 RZ199 || 
|- id="2003 SF170" bgcolor=#FFC2E0
| 1 ||  || AMO || 19.4 || data-sort-value="0.47" | 470 m || multiple || 2003–2019 || 03 Apr 2019 || 64 || align=left | Disc.: NEAT || 
|- id="2003 SH170" bgcolor=#FA8072
| – ||  || MCA || 18.7 || data-sort-value="0.76" | 760 m || single || 6 days || 28 Sep 2003 || 20 || align=left | Disc.: NEAT || 
|- id="2003 SJ170" bgcolor=#FFC2E0
| 1 ||  || AMO || 19.6 || data-sort-value="0.43" | 430 m || multiple || 2003–2007 || 05 Oct 2007 || 102 || align=left | Disc.: LINEAR || 
|- id="2003 SW170" bgcolor=#fefefe
| 0 ||  || MBA-I || 17.8 || data-sort-value="0.82" | 820 m || multiple || 2003–2020 || 20 Apr 2020 || 140 || align=left | Disc.: Uccle Obs. || 
|- id="2003 SO171" bgcolor=#E9E9E9
| 0 ||  || MBA-M || 17.5 || data-sort-value="0.94" | 940 m || multiple || 2003–2020 || 08 Dec 2020 || 124 || align=left | Disc.: Spacewatch || 
|- id="2003 SY171" bgcolor=#fefefe
| 0 ||  || MBA-I || 18.53 || data-sort-value="0.58" | 580 m || multiple || 2002–2021 || 08 May 2021 || 107 || align=left | Disc.: Spacewatch || 
|- id="2003 SG172" bgcolor=#E9E9E9
| 0 ||  || MBA-M || 17.7 || data-sort-value="0.86" | 860 m || multiple || 2003–2020 || 18 Dec 2020 || 43 || align=left | Disc.: NEAT || 
|- id="2003 SX172" bgcolor=#d6d6d6
| 0 ||  || MBA-O || 16.2 || 3.2 km || multiple || 2000–2021 || 04 Jan 2021 || 230 || align=left | Disc.: LINEARAlt.: 2014 ST279 || 
|- id="2003 SV173" bgcolor=#E9E9E9
| 0 ||  || MBA-M || 17.94 || 1.1 km || multiple || 2003–2020 || 10 Oct 2020 || 94 || align=left | Disc.: LINEAR || 
|- id="2003 SE175" bgcolor=#FA8072
| – ||  || MCA || 19.6 || data-sort-value="0.36" | 360 m || single || 35 days || 23 Oct 2003 || 16 || align=left | Disc.: Spacewatch || 
|- id="2003 SL175" bgcolor=#E9E9E9
| 0 ||  || MBA-M || 17.5 || 1.3 km || multiple || 2003–2020 || 19 Oct 2020 || 162 || align=left | Disc.: Spacewatch || 
|- id="2003 SO175" bgcolor=#E9E9E9
| 1 ||  || MBA-M || 17.2 || 1.1 km || multiple || 2003–2021 || 14 Jan 2021 || 193 || align=left | Disc.: Spacewatch || 
|- id="2003 SU175" bgcolor=#fefefe
| 0 ||  || HUN || 18.1 || data-sort-value="0.71" | 710 m || multiple || 2002–2021 || 15 Jan 2021 || 138 || align=left | Disc.: NEATAlt.: 2013 CX191 || 
|- id="2003 SF177" bgcolor=#E9E9E9
| 2 ||  || MBA-M || 18.1 || 1.0 km || multiple || 2003–2020 || 17 Nov 2020 || 75 || align=left | Disc.: NEAT || 
|- id="2003 SL177" bgcolor=#E9E9E9
| 0 ||  || MBA-M || 17.0 || 1.2 km || multiple || 2001–2021 || 16 Jan 2021 || 172 || align=left | Disc.: NEAT || 
|- id="2003 SC178" bgcolor=#d6d6d6
| 0 ||  || MBA-O || 15.93 || 3.6 km || multiple || 2003–2021 || 06 Apr 2021 || 316 || align=left | Disc.: NEAT || 
|- id="2003 SR178" bgcolor=#FA8072
| 0 ||  || MCA || 18.5 || data-sort-value="0.59" | 590 m || multiple || 2003–2019 || 24 Dec 2019 || 173 || align=left | Disc.: LINEAR || 
|- id="2003 SD180" bgcolor=#d6d6d6
| 1 ||  || MBA-O || 18.1 || 1.3 km || multiple || 2003–2019 || 28 Nov 2019 || 74 || align=left | Disc.: Spacewatch || 
|- id="2003 SE180" bgcolor=#d6d6d6
| 2 ||  || MBA-O || 18.1 || 1.3 km || multiple || 2003–2018 || 08 Nov 2018 || 53 || align=left | Disc.: Spacewatch || 
|- id="2003 SQ182" bgcolor=#E9E9E9
| 1 ||  || MBA-M || 17.5 || 1.8 km || multiple || 2003–2020 || 27 Apr 2020 || 87 || align=left | Disc.: CINEOS || 
|- id="2003 SV182" bgcolor=#fefefe
| 0 ||  || MBA-I || 18.8 || data-sort-value="0.52" | 520 m || multiple || 2003–2020 || 20 Oct 2020 || 101 || align=left | Disc.: CINEOSAlt.: 2010 UR84 || 
|- id="2003 SU183" bgcolor=#E9E9E9
| 0 ||  || MBA-M || 17.82 || 1.1 km || multiple || 2003–2022 || 10 Jan 2022 || 60 || align=left | Disc.: Spacewatch || 
|- id="2003 SN184" bgcolor=#E9E9E9
| 3 ||  || MBA-M || 17.7 || data-sort-value="0.86" | 860 m || multiple || 2003–2021 || 06 Jan 2021 || 73 || align=left | Disc.: Spacewatch || 
|- id="2003 SZ184" bgcolor=#E9E9E9
| 1 ||  || MBA-M || 18.0 || 1.1 km || multiple || 2003–2021 || 06 Jan 2021 || 105 || align=left | Disc.: SpacewatchAlt.: 2016 TH135 || 
|- id="2003 SF185" bgcolor=#E9E9E9
| 2 ||  || MBA-M || 18.4 || data-sort-value="0.88" | 880 m || multiple || 2003–2020 || 16 Nov 2020 || 69 || align=left | Disc.: AMOSAlt.: 2020 QA21 || 
|- id="2003 SX185" bgcolor=#E9E9E9
| 1 ||  || MBA-M || 18.70 || data-sort-value="0.76" | 760 m || multiple || 2003–2021 || 29 Nov 2021 || 30 || align=left | Disc.: LONEOS || 
|- id="2003 SY185" bgcolor=#fefefe
| 2 ||  || HUN || 19.0 || data-sort-value="0.47" | 470 m || multiple || 2003–2018 || 16 Nov 2018 || 47 || align=left | Disc.: LONEOSAlt.: 2017 ET3 || 
|- id="2003 SB186" bgcolor=#E9E9E9
| 0 ||  || MBA-M || 16.9 || 1.2 km || multiple || 1995–2021 || 22 Jan 2021 || 173 || align=left | Disc.: SpacewatchAlt.: 1995 QC13 || 
|- id="2003 SP186" bgcolor=#fefefe
| 0 ||  || MBA-I || 18.49 || data-sort-value="0.60" | 600 m || multiple || 2003–2021 || 28 Nov 2021 || 99 || align=left | Disc.: LONEOSAlt.: 2010 PJ1 || 
|- id="2003 SS186" bgcolor=#FA8072
| 0 ||  || MCA || 19.0 || data-sort-value="0.47" | 470 m || multiple || 2003–2021 || 05 Jan 2021 || 55 || align=left | Disc.: LONEOS || 
|- id="2003 SW186" bgcolor=#E9E9E9
| 1 ||  || MBA-M || 17.4 || data-sort-value="0.98" | 980 m || multiple || 2003–2021 || 04 Jan 2021 || 51 || align=left | Disc.: LONEOS || 
|- id="2003 SG187" bgcolor=#d6d6d6
| 0 ||  || MBA-O || 16.59 || 2.7 km || multiple || 2003–2021 || 11 Nov 2021 || 159 || align=left | Disc.: LONEOSAlt.: 2010 BQ112 || 
|- id="2003 SJ187" bgcolor=#E9E9E9
| 0 ||  || MBA-M || 18.2 || data-sort-value="0.96" | 960 m || multiple || 2003–2020 || 14 Dec 2020 || 63 || align=left | Disc.: LONEOS || 
|- id="2003 SK187" bgcolor=#fefefe
| 1 ||  || MBA-I || 18.2 || data-sort-value="0.68" | 680 m || multiple || 2003–2019 || 04 Feb 2019 || 61 || align=left | Disc.: LONEOSAlt.: 2014 WZ301 || 
|- id="2003 SL187" bgcolor=#E9E9E9
| – ||  || MBA-M || 18.2 || data-sort-value="0.68" | 680 m || single || 9 days || 01 Oct 2003 || 19 || align=left | Disc.: LONEOS || 
|- id="2003 SA188" bgcolor=#FA8072
| 0 ||  || MCA || 18.1 || data-sort-value="0.71" | 710 m || multiple || 2000–2019 || 05 Jul 2019 || 110 || align=left | Disc.: LINEAR || 
|- id="2003 SS189" bgcolor=#E9E9E9
| 0 ||  || MBA-M || 17.54 || 1.7 km || multiple || 2003–2021 || 07 Nov 2021 || 93 || align=left | Disc.: NEAT || 
|- id="2003 SM190" bgcolor=#E9E9E9
| 0 ||  || MBA-M || 17.5 || 1.3 km || multiple || 2003–2020 || 08 Aug 2020 || 101 || align=left | Disc.: NEATAlt.: 2003 UE312 || 
|- id="2003 SX190" bgcolor=#E9E9E9
| 0 ||  || MBA-M || 17.3 || 1.5 km || multiple || 2003–2021 || 15 Jan 2021 || 227 || align=left | Disc.: Spacewatch || 
|- id="2003 SP191" bgcolor=#E9E9E9
| 0 ||  || MBA-M || 17.69 || 1.6 km || multiple || 2003–2021 || 08 Dec 2021 || 89 || align=left | Disc.: SpacewatchAlt.: 2012 TL147 || 
|- id="2003 SR191" bgcolor=#E9E9E9
| 2 ||  || MBA-M || 17.5 || 1.8 km || multiple || 2003–2017 || 23 Oct 2017 || 46 || align=left | Disc.: Spacewatch || 
|- id="2003 SA194" bgcolor=#E9E9E9
| 0 ||  || MBA-M || 17.1 || 1.1 km || multiple || 2003–2021 || 04 Jan 2021 || 111 || align=left | Disc.: NEAT || 
|- id="2003 SC194" bgcolor=#fefefe
| 0 ||  || MBA-I || 17.8 || data-sort-value="0.82" | 820 m || multiple || 2003–2018 || 04 Dec 2018 || 113 || align=left | Disc.: AMOS || 
|- id="2003 SC197" bgcolor=#E9E9E9
| 0 ||  || MBA-M || 17.5 || 1.3 km || multiple || 2003–2020 || 11 Oct 2020 || 96 || align=left | Disc.: LONEOSAlt.: 2016 NQ31, 2016 TP67 || 
|- id="2003 SL200" bgcolor=#E9E9E9
| 0 ||  || MBA-M || 16.67 || 1.9 km || multiple || 1999–2022 || 27 Jan 2022 || 149 || align=left | Disc.: NEATAlt.: 2013 BO38, 2015 KO103 || 
|- id="2003 SD201" bgcolor=#FFC2E0
| 1 ||  || AMO || 17.9 || data-sort-value="0.93" | 930 m || multiple || 2003–2019 || 23 Dec 2019 || 163 || align=left | Disc.: NEATNEO larger than 1 kilometer || 
|- id="2003 SH202" bgcolor=#d6d6d6
| 0 ||  || MBA-O || 16.1 || 3.4 km || multiple || 2003–2021 || 18 Jan 2021 || 88 || align=left | Disc.: LONEOS || 
|- id="2003 SK202" bgcolor=#fefefe
| 0 ||  || MBA-I || 18.48 || data-sort-value="0.60" | 600 m || multiple || 2003–2021 || 27 Oct 2021 || 166 || align=left | Disc.: LONEOSAlt.: 2014 UA45 || 
|- id="2003 SE205" bgcolor=#d6d6d6
| 1 ||  || MBA-O || 17.1 || 2.1 km || multiple || 1992–2021 || 12 Jan 2021 || 51 || align=left | Disc.: NEATAlt.: 2010 DD81, 2014 QQ389 || 
|- id="2003 SL205" bgcolor=#fefefe
| 1 ||  || MBA-I || 18.7 || 1.0 km || multiple || 2003–2020 || 16 May 2020 || 91 || align=left | Disc.: AMOS || 
|- id="2003 SA206" bgcolor=#E9E9E9
| 0 ||  || MBA-M || 17.4 || data-sort-value="0.98" | 980 m || multiple || 1991–2021 || 18 Jan 2021 || 134 || align=left | Disc.: NEAT || 
|- id="2003 SH206" bgcolor=#E9E9E9
| 0 ||  || MBA-M || 18.26 || 1.2 km || multiple || 2003–2021 || 09 Sep 2021 || 47 || align=left | Disc.: NEAT || 
|- id="2003 SF207" bgcolor=#d6d6d6
| 0 ||  || MBA-O || 15.9 || 3.7 km || multiple || 2003–2021 || 19 Jan 2021 || 287 || align=left | Disc.: LINEARAlt.: 2011 FZ148 || 
|- id="2003 SJ208" bgcolor=#E9E9E9
| 0 ||  || MBA-M || 17.4 || data-sort-value="0.98" | 980 m || multiple || 1999–2021 || 04 Jan 2021 || 106 || align=left | Disc.: LINEARAlt.: 1999 TM168 || 
|- id="2003 SV208" bgcolor=#E9E9E9
| 0 ||  || MBA-M || 16.63 || 2.6 km || multiple || 2001–2021 || 01 Nov 2021 || 181 || align=left | Disc.: NEAT || 
|- id="2003 SK209" bgcolor=#fefefe
| 0 ||  || MBA-I || 18.15 || data-sort-value="0.70" | 700 m || multiple || 2003–2021 || 18 Apr 2021 || 117 || align=left | Disc.: AMOSAlt.: 2018 SJ6 || 
|- id="2003 SX209" bgcolor=#E9E9E9
| 0 ||  || MBA-M || 16.68 || 2.6 km || multiple || 1994–2021 || 05 Aug 2021 || 207 || align=left | Disc.: AMOS || 
|- id="2003 SS210" bgcolor=#E9E9E9
| 0 ||  || MBA-M || 18.1 || data-sort-value="0.71" | 710 m || multiple || 1999–2020 || 20 Dec 2020 || 70 || align=left | Disc.: NEAT || 
|- id="2003 ST213" bgcolor=#E9E9E9
| 0 ||  || MBA-M || 17.95 || 1.1 km || multiple || 2003–2021 || 30 Nov 2021 || 64 || align=left | Disc.: Desert Eagle Obs.Alt.: 2003 SM314 || 
|- id="2003 SL214" bgcolor=#FA8072
| 2 ||  || MCA || 18.9 || data-sort-value="0.49" | 490 m || multiple || 2003–2016 || 05 Dec 2016 || 91 || align=left | Disc.: Desert Eagle Obs. || 
|- id="2003 SN214" bgcolor=#FFC2E0
| 5 ||  || APO || 22.7 || data-sort-value="0.10" | 100 m || single || 34 days || 25 Oct 2003 || 18 || align=left | Disc.: Spacewatch || 
|- id="2003 SO214" bgcolor=#FA8072
| 3 ||  || MCA || 19.4 || data-sort-value="0.39" | 390 m || multiple || 2003–2010 || 13 Dec 2010 || 38 || align=left | Disc.: NEAT || 
|- id="2003 SP214" bgcolor=#FA8072
| – ||  || MCA || 19.5 || data-sort-value="0.37" | 370 m || single || 2 days || 28 Sep 2003 || 14 || align=left | Disc.: NEAT || 
|- id="2003 SS214" bgcolor=#FFC2E0
| 0 ||  || AMO || 20.0 || data-sort-value="0.856" | 856 m || multiple || 2003–2015 || 21 Jan 2015 || 121 || align=left | Disc.: Črni Vrh Obs. || 
|- id="2003 SU214" bgcolor=#FFC2E0
| 0 ||  || AMO || 18.9 || data-sort-value="0.59" | 590 m || multiple || 2003–2007 || 15 Oct 2007 || 206 || align=left | Disc.: LINEAR || 
|- id="2003 SD215" bgcolor=#fefefe
| 1 ||  || MBA-I || 18.5 || data-sort-value="0.59" | 590 m || multiple || 2003–2016 || 25 Sep 2016 || 50 || align=left | Disc.: Prescott Obs. || 
|- id="2003 SH215" bgcolor=#FFC2E0
| 8 ||  || AMO || 24.9 || data-sort-value="0.037" | 37 m || single || 6 days || 30 Sep 2003 || 23 || align=left | Disc.: Paranal Obs. || 
|- id="2003 SK215" bgcolor=#FFC2E0
| 5 ||  || AMO || 21.5 || data-sort-value="0.18" | 180 m || single || 32 days || 30 Oct 2003 || 30 || align=left | Disc.: LINEAR || 
|- id="2003 SL215" bgcolor=#FFC2E0
| 0 ||  || AMO || 20.66 || data-sort-value="0.26" | 260 m || multiple || 2003–2021 || 29 Nov 2021 || 82 || align=left | Disc.: LONEOS || 
|- id="2003 SM215" bgcolor=#FFC2E0
| 6 ||  || APO || 27.5 || data-sort-value="0.011" | 11 m || single || 2 days || 30 Sep 2003 || 27 || align=left | Disc.: LINEAR || 
|- id="2003 SN215" bgcolor=#FFC2E0
| 5 ||  || AMO || 22.4 || data-sort-value="0.12" | 120 m || single || 81 days || 18 Dec 2003 || 28 || align=left | Disc.: Spacewatch || 
|- id="2003 SO215" bgcolor=#fefefe
| 0 ||  || MBA-I || 18.7 || data-sort-value="0.54" | 540 m || multiple || 2003–2021 || 11 Jun 2021 || 48 || align=left | Disc.: VATTAlt.: 2007 US80 || 
|- id="2003 SO216" bgcolor=#E9E9E9
| 1 ||  || MBA-M || 17.6 || 1.3 km || multiple || 2003–2020 || 20 Dec 2020 || 361 || align=left | Disc.: LINEAR || 
|- id="2003 SV216" bgcolor=#E9E9E9
| 2 ||  || MBA-M || 18.2 || data-sort-value="0.96" | 960 m || multiple || 2003–2020 || 23 Nov 2020 || 32 || align=left | Disc.: Sierra Nevada Obs.Added on 17 January 2021 || 
|- id="2003 SH217" bgcolor=#FA8072
| 2 ||  || MCA || 18.8 || data-sort-value="0.52" | 520 m || multiple || 2003–2020 || 03 Feb 2020 || 50 || align=left | Disc.: Desert Eagle Obs. || 
|- id="2003 SZ218" bgcolor=#FA8072
| 0 ||  || HUN || 18.88 || data-sort-value="0.50" | 500 m || multiple || 2003–2021 || 12 Dec 2021 || 66 || align=left | Disc.: LINEAR || 
|- id="2003 SR221" bgcolor=#E9E9E9
| – ||  || MBA-M || 19.2 || data-sort-value="0.43" | 430 m || single || 14 days || 03 Oct 2003 || 14 || align=left | Disc.: Spacewatch || 
|- id="2003 ST221" bgcolor=#FA8072
| 0 ||  || MCA || 20.28 || data-sort-value="0.26" | 260 m || multiple || 2003–2021 || 07 Nov 2021 || 59 || align=left | Disc.: SpacewatchAlt.: 2018 FH4 || 
|- id="2003 SU221" bgcolor=#FA8072
| – ||  || MCA || 20.2 || data-sort-value="0.27" | 270 m || single || 21 days || 20 Oct 2003 || 15 || align=left | Disc.: Spacewatch || 
|- id="2003 SQ222" bgcolor=#FFC2E0
| 7 ||  || APO || 30.1 || data-sort-value="0.0034" | 3 m || single || 4 days || 02 Oct 2003 || 17 || align=left | Disc.: LONEOS || 
|- id="2003 ST222" bgcolor=#fefefe
| 0 ||  || HUN || 19.45 || data-sort-value="0.38" | 380 m || multiple || 2003–2019 || 08 May 2019 || 25 || align=left | Disc.: Spacewatch || 
|- id="2003 SL223" bgcolor=#E9E9E9
| 0 ||  || MBA-M || 17.4 || 1.4 km || multiple || 2003–2021 || 11 Jan 2021 || 225 || align=left | Disc.: Desert Eagle Obs.Alt.: 2016 UD151 || 
|- id="2003 SZ226" bgcolor=#d6d6d6
| 1 ||  || MBA-O || 17.7 || 1.6 km || multiple || 2003–2020 || 23 Dec 2020 || 35 || align=left | Disc.: Spacewatch || 
|- id="2003 SW227" bgcolor=#fefefe
| 0 ||  || MBA-I || 18.39 || data-sort-value="0.62" | 620 m || multiple || 2003–2022 || 06 Jan 2022 || 174 || align=left | Disc.: LINEAR || 
|- id="2003 SE228" bgcolor=#d6d6d6
| 0 ||  || MBA-O || 16.86 || 2.4 km || multiple || 2001–2021 || 12 May 2021 || 88 || align=left | Disc.: SpacewatchAlt.: 2016 EH21 || 
|- id="2003 SN228" bgcolor=#E9E9E9
| 0 ||  || MBA-M || 17.4 || 1.4 km || multiple || 2003–2021 || 12 Jan 2021 || 215 || align=left | Disc.: LINEAR || 
|- id="2003 SP228" bgcolor=#fefefe
| 0 ||  || MBA-I || 17.5 || data-sort-value="0.94" | 940 m || multiple || 2003–2020 || 21 Mar 2020 || 162 || align=left | Disc.: LINEARAlt.: 2009 DQ131, 2014 QG126, 2016 AZ141 || 
|- id="2003 SA229" bgcolor=#fefefe
| 1 ||  || MBA-I || 19.3 || data-sort-value="0.41" | 410 m || multiple || 2003–2019 || 04 Jul 2019 || 46 || align=left | Disc.: LPL/Spacewatch II || 
|- id="2003 SR229" bgcolor=#E9E9E9
| 1 ||  || MBA-M || 18.6 || data-sort-value="0.80" | 800 m || multiple || 2002–2020 || 10 Nov 2020 || 32 || align=left | Disc.: SpacewatchAdded on 22 July 2020 || 
|- id="2003 SV229" bgcolor=#d6d6d6
| 0 ||  || MBA-O || 16.9 || 2.3 km || multiple || 2000–2020 || 22 Jan 2020 || 67 || align=left | Disc.: Spacewatch || 
|- id="2003 SM230" bgcolor=#fefefe
| 0 ||  || MBA-I || 18.1 || data-sort-value="0.71" | 710 m || multiple || 2003–2020 || 23 Jun 2020 || 61 || align=left | Disc.: NEAT || 
|- id="2003 SL231" bgcolor=#d6d6d6
| 0 ||  || MBA-O || 16.72 || 2.5 km || multiple || 2003–2021 || 10 May 2021 || 139 || align=left | Disc.: NEAT || 
|- id="2003 SD232" bgcolor=#d6d6d6
| 0 ||  || MBA-O || 16.2 || 3.2 km || multiple || 2001–2020 || 17 Nov 2020 || 168 || align=left | Disc.: AMOSAlt.: 2014 WJ501 || 
|- id="2003 SX232" bgcolor=#E9E9E9
| 1 ||  || MBA-M || 17.2 || 2.0 km || multiple || 2002–2017 || 14 Nov 2017 || 72 || align=left | Disc.: NEAT || 
|- id="2003 SH233" bgcolor=#fefefe
| 0 ||  || MBA-I || 18.1 || data-sort-value="0.71" | 710 m || multiple || 2003–2021 || 06 Jan 2021 || 133 || align=left | Disc.: NEAT || 
|- id="2003 SO233" bgcolor=#d6d6d6
| 0 ||  || MBA-O || 16.1 || 3.4 km || multiple || 2003–2021 || 16 Jan 2021 || 212 || align=left | Disc.: NEATAlt.: 2014 TZ47 || 
|- id="2003 SD234" bgcolor=#E9E9E9
| 0 ||  || MBA-M || 16.82 || 1.8 km || multiple || 2003–2022 || 26 Jan 2022 || 165 || align=left | Disc.: NEATAlt.: 2012 VN96 || 
|- id="2003 SH234" bgcolor=#fefefe
| 0 ||  || MBA-I || 18.1 || data-sort-value="0.71" | 710 m || multiple || 2003–2019 || 28 Dec 2019 || 111 || align=left | Disc.: NEATAlt.: 2003 SV388, 2015 HZ23 || 
|- id="2003 ST234" bgcolor=#fefefe
| 0 ||  || MBA-I || 17.54 || data-sort-value="0.92" | 920 m || multiple || 2003–2022 || 16 Jan 2022 || 285 || align=left | Disc.: AMOS || 
|- id="2003 SP236" bgcolor=#d6d6d6
| 0 ||  || MBA-O || 16.2 || 3.2 km || multiple || 2003–2020 || 28 Jan 2020 || 85 || align=left | Disc.: LINEAR || 
|- id="2003 SG237" bgcolor=#d6d6d6
| 0 ||  || MBA-O || 17.1 || 2.1 km || multiple || 2003–2019 || 28 Oct 2019 || 86 || align=left | Disc.: LINEAR || 
|- id="2003 SK238" bgcolor=#d6d6d6
| 0 ||  || MBA-O || 16.3 || 3.1 km || multiple || 2003–2021 || 17 Jan 2021 || 150 || align=left | Disc.: LINEARAlt.: 2014 WL235 || 
|- id="2003 SC239" bgcolor=#fefefe
| 1 ||  || MBA-I || 18.4 || data-sort-value="0.62" | 620 m || multiple || 2003–2020 || 26 Jan 2020 || 46 || align=left | Disc.: LPL/Spacewatch IIAdded on 30 September 2021Alt.: 2003 SA473, 2007 WY12 || 
|- id="2003 SD239" bgcolor=#d6d6d6
| 0 ||  || MBA-O || 17.1 || 2.1 km || multiple || 2003–2019 || 30 Nov 2019 || 61 || align=left | Disc.: LPL/Spacewatch IIAdded on 30 September 2021Alt.: 2003 SZ472, 2006 HV130 || 
|- id="2003 SF239" bgcolor=#E9E9E9
| 0 ||  || MBA-M || 18.00 || 1.4 km || multiple || 2003–2021 || 11 Sep 2021 || 54 || align=left | Disc.: LPL/Spacewatch II || 
|- id="2003 SH239" bgcolor=#d6d6d6
| 0 ||  || MBA-O || 16.3 || 3.1 km || multiple || 1995–2020 || 16 Oct 2020 || 85 || align=left | Disc.: LPL/Spacewatch IIAlt.: 2014 QG482 || 
|- id="2003 SJ239" bgcolor=#d6d6d6
| 1 ||  || MBA-O || 17.2 || 2.0 km || multiple || 2003–2020 || 17 Oct 2020 || 72 || align=left | Disc.: LPL/Spacewatch IIAlt.: 2010 BS107 || 
|- id="2003 SL239" bgcolor=#E9E9E9
| 0 ||  || MBA-M || 17.49 || data-sort-value="0.94" | 940 m || multiple || 2003–2022 || 27 Jan 2022 || 96 || align=left | Disc.: LPL/Spacewatch IIAlt.: 2011 SJ213, 2014 GO11 || 
|- id="2003 SN239" bgcolor=#d6d6d6
| 0 ||  || MBA-O || 17.2 || 2.0 km || multiple || 2003–2018 || 08 Aug 2018 || 50 || align=left | Disc.: LPL/Spacewatch II || 
|- id="2003 SO239" bgcolor=#d6d6d6
| 1 ||  || MBA-O || 17.5 || 1.8 km || multiple || 2003–2020 || 08 Dec 2020 || 58 || align=left | Disc.: LPL/Spacewatch II || 
|- id="2003 SQ239" bgcolor=#d6d6d6
| 0 ||  || MBA-O || 17.2 || 2.0 km || multiple || 2003–2020 || 22 Sep 2020 || 69 || align=left | Disc.: LPL/Spacewatch IIAlt.: 2014 QB112 || 
|- id="2003 ST239" bgcolor=#d6d6d6
| 0 ||  || MBA-O || 17.76 || 1.6 km || multiple || 2003–2021 || 29 Nov 2021 || 39 || align=left | Disc.: LPL/Spacewatch IIAdded on 21 August 2021 || 
|- id="2003 SV239" bgcolor=#FA8072
| – ||  || MCA || 20.4 || data-sort-value="0.25" | 250 m || single || 11 days || 29 Sep 2003 || 9 || align=left | Disc.: LPL/Spacewatch II || 
|- id="2003 SA240" bgcolor=#d6d6d6
| 0 ||  || MBA-O || 16.9 || 2.3 km || multiple || 2003–2020 || 21 Oct 2020 || 161 || align=left | Disc.: LPL/Spacewatch IIAdded on 19 October 2020 || 
|- id="2003 SG240" bgcolor=#d6d6d6
| 0 ||  || MBA-O || 16.7 || 2.5 km || multiple || 2003–2021 || 05 Jan 2021 || 50 || align=left | Disc.: SpacewatchAdded on 9 March 2021 || 
|- id="2003 SH240" bgcolor=#E9E9E9
| 0 ||  || MBA-M || 16.6 || 2.0 km || multiple || 2003–2020 || 15 Dec 2020 || 143 || align=left | Disc.: SpacewatchAlt.: 2010 JU168, 2012 UQ64 || 
|- id="2003 SL240" bgcolor=#fefefe
| 0 ||  || MBA-I || 19.35 || data-sort-value="0.40" | 400 m || multiple || 2003–2021 || 07 Sep 2021 || 39 || align=left | Disc.: SpacewatchAlt.: 2014 UP65 || 
|- id="2003 SO240" bgcolor=#fefefe
| 2 ||  || MBA-I || 18.7 || data-sort-value="0.54" | 540 m || multiple || 2003–2014 || 23 Sep 2014 || 23 || align=left | Disc.: Spacewatch || 
|- id="2003 SP240" bgcolor=#E9E9E9
| 0 ||  || MBA-M || 18.2 || data-sort-value="0.68" | 680 m || multiple || 2003–2020 || 11 Nov 2020 || 44 || align=left | Disc.: Spacewatch || 
|- id="2003 SV240" bgcolor=#d6d6d6
| 0 ||  || MBA-O || 16.1 || 3.4 km || multiple || 2003–2020 || 11 Nov 2020 || 108 || align=left | Disc.: SpacewatchAlt.: 2014 SQ146 || 
|- id="2003 SC241" bgcolor=#d6d6d6
| 0 ||  || MBA-O || 17.2 || 2.0 km || multiple || 2003–2019 || 28 Oct 2019 || 75 || align=left | Disc.: SpacewatchAlt.: 2013 NC14, 2014 WW121 || 
|- id="2003 SG241" bgcolor=#d6d6d6
| 0 ||  || MBA-O || 16.96 || 2.3 km || multiple || 2003–2021 || 03 May 2021 || 115 || align=left | Disc.: SpacewatchAlt.: 2016 GP20 || 
|- id="2003 SM241" bgcolor=#d6d6d6
| 1 ||  || MBA-O || 18.2 || 1.3 km || multiple || 2003–2020 || 10 Dec 2020 || 43 || align=left | Disc.: Spacewatch || 
|- id="2003 SO241" bgcolor=#d6d6d6
| 0 ||  || MBA-O || 17.0 || 2.2 km || multiple || 2003–2021 || 18 Jan 2021 || 101 || align=left | Disc.: SpacewatchAlt.: 2014 UF90 || 
|- id="2003 SP241" bgcolor=#d6d6d6
| 0 ||  || MBA-O || 17.3 || 1.9 km || multiple || 2003–2021 || 15 Mar 2021 || 65 || align=left | Disc.: SpacewatchAlt.: 2008 RK69 || 
|- id="2003 SS241" bgcolor=#E9E9E9
| 0 ||  || MBA-M || 17.1 || 1.6 km || multiple || 2003–2020 || 17 Oct 2020 || 140 || align=left | Disc.: Spacewatch || 
|- id="2003 SW241" bgcolor=#fefefe
| 0 ||  || MBA-I || 19.3 || data-sort-value="0.41" | 410 m || multiple || 2003–2020 || 11 Jul 2020 || 40 || align=left | Disc.: LPL/Spacewatch IIAdded on 22 July 2020 || 
|- id="2003 SY241" bgcolor=#fefefe
| 0 ||  || MBA-I || 18.6 || data-sort-value="0.57" | 570 m || multiple || 2003–2020 || 23 Dec 2020 || 60 || align=left | Disc.: LPL/Spacewatch II || 
|- id="2003 SC242" bgcolor=#E9E9E9
| 0 ||  || MBA-M || 18.07 || 1.4 km || multiple || 2003–2021 || 04 Oct 2021 || 56 || align=left | Disc.: LPL/Spacewatch IIAdded on 22 July 2020 || 
|- id="2003 SG242" bgcolor=#E9E9E9
| 1 ||  || MBA-M || 18.4 || data-sort-value="0.88" | 880 m || multiple || 2003–2021 || 04 Jan 2021 || 54 || align=left | Disc.: SpacewatchAdded on 17 January 2021 || 
|- id="2003 SJ242" bgcolor=#d6d6d6
| 0 ||  || MBA-O || 16.8 || 2.4 km || multiple || 2003–2021 || 08 Jan 2021 || 116 || align=left | Disc.: Spacewatch || 
|- id="2003 SO242" bgcolor=#E9E9E9
| 0 ||  || MBA-M || 18.0 || 1.1 km || multiple || 2003–2020 || 14 Nov 2020 || 79 || align=left | Disc.: SpacewatchAlt.: 2011 OV6 || 
|- id="2003 SS242" bgcolor=#d6d6d6
| 0 ||  || MBA-O || 17.2 || 2.0 km || multiple || 2003–2020 || 14 Nov 2020 || 45 || align=left | Disc.: SpacewatchAlt.: 2014 ST344 || 
|- id="2003 SZ242" bgcolor=#E9E9E9
| 0 ||  || MBA-M || 18.18 || data-sort-value="0.97" | 970 m || multiple || 2003–2021 || 28 Nov 2021 || 40 || align=left | Disc.: Spacewatch || 
|- id="2003 SG243" bgcolor=#E9E9E9
| 0 ||  || MBA-M || 17.51 || 1.8 km || multiple || 1994–2021 || 08 Aug 2021 || 72 || align=left | Disc.: LPL/Spacewatch II || 
|- id="2003 SJ243" bgcolor=#E9E9E9
| 2 ||  || MBA-M || 18.3 || 1.2 km || multiple || 2003–2017 || 28 Sep 2017 || 27 || align=left | Disc.: LPL/Spacewatch IIAlt.: 2017 QV83 || 
|- id="2003 SK243" bgcolor=#E9E9E9
| 1 ||  || MBA-M || 17.88 || 1.5 km || multiple || 2003–2021 || 30 Oct 2021 || 93 || align=left | Disc.: LPL/Spacewatch IIAlt.: 2012 SK38 || 
|- id="2003 SM243" bgcolor=#fefefe
| 4 ||  || MBA-I || 19.69 || data-sort-value="0.28" | 360 m || multiple || 2003-2014 || 25 Sep 2014 || 25 || align=left | Disc.: LPL/Spacewatch IIAlt.: 2014 SD236 || 
|- id="2003 SN243" bgcolor=#FA8072
| 2 ||  || MCA || 19.4 || data-sort-value="0.39" | 390 m || multiple || 2003–2021 || 08 May 2021 || 34 || align=left | Disc.: LPL/Spacewatch II || 
|- id="2003 SP243" bgcolor=#fefefe
| 0 ||  || MBA-I || 18.71 || data-sort-value="0.54" | 540 m || multiple || 2003–2021 || 30 Jul 2021 || 90 || align=left | Disc.: LPL/Spacewatch II || 
|- id="2003 SQ243" bgcolor=#fefefe
| 2 ||  || MBA-I || 19.9 || data-sort-value="0.31" | 310 m || multiple || 2003–2020 || 22 Aug 2020 || 24 || align=left | Disc.: LPL/Spacewatch IIAdded on 11 May 2021Alt.: 2020 MA30 || 
|- id="2003 ST243" bgcolor=#d6d6d6
| 0 ||  || MBA-O || 17.49 || 1.8 km || multiple || 2003–2022 || 27 Jan 2022 || 58 || align=left | Disc.: LPL/Spacewatch II || 
|- id="2003 SU243" bgcolor=#d6d6d6
| E ||  || MBA-O || 17.3 || 1.9 km || single || 3 days || 29 Sep 2003 || 10 || align=left | Disc.: LPL/Spacewatch II || 
|- id="2003 SY243" bgcolor=#FA8072
| 1 ||  || MCA || 20.1 || data-sort-value="0.28" | 280 m || multiple || 2003–2019 || 25 Sep 2019 || 45 || align=left | Disc.: LPL/Spacewatch II || 
|- id="2003 SC245" bgcolor=#d6d6d6
| 0 ||  || MBA-O || 17.4 || 1.8 km || multiple || 2003–2021 || 07 Jan 2021 || 82 || align=left | Disc.: LINEARAlt.: 2015 AF4 || 
|- id="2003 SB246" bgcolor=#E9E9E9
| 0 ||  || MBA-M || 17.32 || 1.0 km || multiple || 2003–2020 || 22 Nov 2020 || 50 || align=left | Disc.: LINEAR || 
|- id="2003 SG246" bgcolor=#d6d6d6
| 0 ||  || MBA-O || 17.72 || 1.6 km || multiple || 2003–2019 || 19 Nov 2019 || 84 || align=left | Disc.: LINEARAlt.: 2019 NV25 || 
|- id="2003 SW247" bgcolor=#FA8072
| 1 ||  || MCA || 18.6 || data-sort-value="0.57" | 570 m || multiple || 2003–2019 || 23 Oct 2019 || 74 || align=left | Disc.: LINEARAlt.: 2016 SG23 || 
|- id="2003 SP253" bgcolor=#d6d6d6
| 0 ||  || MBA-O || 16.1 || 3.4 km || multiple || 2003–2021 || 03 Jan 2021 || 190 || align=left | Disc.: LINEARAlt.: 2014 SW140 || 
|- id="2003 SG254" bgcolor=#E9E9E9
| – ||  || MBA-M || 20.3 || data-sort-value="0.37" | 370 m || single || 30 days || 27 Oct 2003 || 12 || align=left | Disc.: LPL/Spacewatch II || 
|- id="2003 SM254" bgcolor=#d6d6d6
| 0 ||  || MBA-O || 17.0 || 2.2 km || multiple || 2003–2021 || 16 Jan 2021 || 84 || align=left | Disc.: LPL/Spacewatch II || 
|- id="2003 SH255" bgcolor=#d6d6d6
| 0 ||  || MBA-O || 16.7 || 2.5 km || multiple || 2003–2019 || 29 Nov 2019 || 58 || align=left | Disc.: LPL/Spacewatch II || 
|- id="2003 SJ255" bgcolor=#E9E9E9
| 1 ||  || MBA-M || 19.09 || data-sort-value="0.85" | 850 m || multiple || 2003–2021 || 08 Nov 2021 || 53 || align=left | Disc.: LPL/Spacewatch IIAdded on 21 August 2021 || 
|- id="2003 SG256" bgcolor=#d6d6d6
| 0 ||  || MBA-O || 17.0 || 2.2 km || multiple || 2003–2021 || 07 Jan 2021 || 72 || align=left | Disc.: LPL/Spacewatch II || 
|- id="2003 SP256" bgcolor=#E9E9E9
| 0 ||  || MBA-M || 18.23 || data-sort-value="0.95" | 950 m || multiple || 2003–2022 || 07 Jan 2022 || 60 || align=left | Disc.: LPL/Spacewatch II || 
|- id="2003 SO257" bgcolor=#fefefe
| 0 ||  || MBA-I || 18.2 || data-sort-value="0.68" | 680 m || multiple || 2003–2019 || 28 Aug 2019 || 141 || align=left | Disc.: LINEAR || 
|- id="2003 SB258" bgcolor=#d6d6d6
| 0 ||  || MBA-O || 16.8 || 2.4 km || multiple || 2003–2021 || 05 Jan 2021 || 185 || align=left | Disc.: LPL/Spacewatch IIAlt.: 2014 TE3 || 
|- id="2003 SF260" bgcolor=#FA8072
| 0 ||  || HUN || 18.57 || data-sort-value="0.57" | 570 m || multiple || 2003–2021 || 09 Apr 2021 || 93 || align=left | Disc.: LINEAR || 
|- id="2003 SH260" bgcolor=#E9E9E9
| 0 ||  || MBA-M || 17.26 || 1.5 km || multiple || 2003–2021 || 01 Dec 2021 || 83 || align=left | Disc.: LINEARAlt.: 2016 QQ54 || 
|- id="2003 SP260" bgcolor=#E9E9E9
| 0 ||  || MBA-M || 17.72 || data-sort-value="0.85" | 850 m || multiple || 2003–2022 || 26 Jan 2022 || 71 || align=left | Disc.: Spacewatch || 
|- id="2003 SH261" bgcolor=#fefefe
| 1 ||  || MBA-I || 18.0 || data-sort-value="0.75" | 750 m || multiple || 2003–2020 || 26 Jan 2020 || 33 || align=left | Disc.: LINEAR || 
|- id="2003 SO261" bgcolor=#E9E9E9
| 1 ||  || MBA-M || 17.6 || 1.3 km || multiple || 2003–2021 || 11 Jan 2021 || 253 || align=left | Disc.: LINEAR || 
|- id="2003 SU261" bgcolor=#d6d6d6
| 0 ||  || MBA-O || 16.80 || 2.0 km || multiple || 2003–2022 || 06 Jan 2022 || 383 || align=left | Disc.: LINEAR || 
|- id="2003 SE262" bgcolor=#fefefe
| 0 ||  || MBA-I || 17.96 || data-sort-value="0.76" | 760 m || multiple || 1995–2021 || 06 Apr 2021 || 97 || align=left | Disc.: Spacewatch || 
|- id="2003 SF262" bgcolor=#d6d6d6
| 0 ||  || MBA-O || 15.9 || 3.7 km || multiple || 2001–2020 || 15 Nov 2020 || 164 || align=left | Disc.: Spacewatch || 
|- id="2003 SG262" bgcolor=#fefefe
| 2 ||  || MBA-I || 18.8 || data-sort-value="0.52" | 520 m || multiple || 2003–2018 || 17 Nov 2018 || 57 || align=left | Disc.: Spacewatch || 
|- id="2003 SJ262" bgcolor=#E9E9E9
| – ||  || MBA-M || 17.6 || 1.3 km || single || 27 days || 24 Oct 2003 || 19 || align=left | Disc.: Spacewatch || 
|- id="2003 SK262" bgcolor=#d6d6d6
| 0 ||  || MBA-O || 16.6 || 2.7 km || multiple || 2003–2019 || 24 Dec 2019 || 111 || align=left | Disc.: LINEAR || 
|- id="2003 SX262" bgcolor=#d6d6d6
| 0 ||  || MBA-O || 16.4 || 2.9 km || multiple || 2003–2021 || 18 Jan 2021 || 157 || align=left | Disc.: LINEARAlt.: 2004 YJ37 || 
|- id="2003 SZ262" bgcolor=#d6d6d6
| 0 ||  || MBA-O || 16.3 || 3.1 km || multiple || 2003–2020 || 25 Nov 2020 || 164 || align=left | Disc.: LINEARAlt.: 2014 QV328 || 
|- id="2003 SD263" bgcolor=#E9E9E9
| – ||  || MBA-M || 18.6 || data-sort-value="0.57" | 570 m || single || 20 days || 18 Oct 2003 || 14 || align=left | Disc.: LINEAR || 
|- id="2003 SE263" bgcolor=#E9E9E9
| 0 ||  || MBA-M || 16.75 || 2.5 km || multiple || 2003–2021 || 31 Jul 2021 || 190 || align=left | Disc.: LINEARAlt.: 2012 QL40 || 
|- id="2003 SJ264" bgcolor=#FA8072
| 0 ||  || MCA || 19.44 || data-sort-value="0.38" | 380 m || multiple || 2000–2021 || 10 Apr 2021 || 67 || align=left | Disc.: LINEARAlt.: 2006 QO55 || 
|- id="2003 SP264" bgcolor=#FA8072
| 0 ||  || MCA || 18.2 || data-sort-value="0.68" | 680 m || multiple || 2002–2020 || 05 Nov 2020 || 216 || align=left | Disc.: LINEAR || 
|- id="2003 ST264" bgcolor=#fefefe
| 0 ||  || MBA-I || 17.75 || data-sort-value="0.84" | 840 m || multiple || 2003–2021 || 11 May 2021 || 69 || align=left | Disc.: LINEARAlt.: 2007 VL40 || 
|- id="2003 SE265" bgcolor=#E9E9E9
| 3 ||  || MBA-M || 18.4 || data-sort-value="0.62" | 620 m || multiple || 2003–2020 || 06 Dec 2020 || 35 || align=left | Disc.: SpacewatchAdded on 17 January 2021 || 
|- id="2003 SG265" bgcolor=#fefefe
| 0 ||  || HUN || 18.99 || data-sort-value="0.47" | 470 m || multiple || 2002–2021 || 27 Nov 2021 || 28 || align=left | Disc.: SpacewatchAdded on 21 August 2021 || 
|- id="2003 SL265" bgcolor=#d6d6d6
| 0 ||  || MBA-O || 17.46 || 1.8 km || multiple || 2003–2021 || 15 Apr 2021 || 66 || align=left | Disc.: SpacewatchAdded on 22 July 2020 || 
|- id="2003 SO265" bgcolor=#E9E9E9
| 0 ||  || MBA-M || 16.96 || 2.3 km || multiple || 2003–2021 || 09 Nov 2021 || 139 || align=left | Disc.: SpacewatchAlt.: 2003 TN58, 2010 JR130, 2013 YX34 || 
|- id="2003 SR265" bgcolor=#E9E9E9
| – ||  || MBA-M || 19.4 || data-sort-value="0.39" | 390 m || single || 12 days || 30 Sep 2003 || 9 || align=left | Disc.: Spacewatch || 
|- id="2003 ST265" bgcolor=#E9E9E9
| 1 ||  || MBA-M || 18.10 || 1.3 km || multiple || 2003–2021 || 26 Oct 2021 || 64 || align=left | Disc.: Spacewatch || 
|- id="2003 SX265" bgcolor=#E9E9E9
| 4 ||  || MBA-M || 18.7 || 1.0 km || multiple || 2003–2017 || 22 Nov 2017 || 22 || align=left | Disc.: LPL/Spacewatch II || 
|- id="2003 SX266" bgcolor=#fefefe
| 1 ||  || MBA-I || 18.3 || data-sort-value="0.65" | 650 m || multiple || 2003–2021 || 17 Jan 2021 || 37 || align=left | Disc.: LINEAR || 
|- id="2003 SM267" bgcolor=#d6d6d6
| 0 ||  || MBA-O || 17.1 || 2.1 km || multiple || 2003–2019 || 01 Nov 2019 || 75 || align=left | Disc.: SpacewatchAlt.: 2010 DW102 || 
|- id="2003 SO267" bgcolor=#d6d6d6
| 0 ||  || MBA-O || 16.5 || 2.8 km || multiple || 2003–2020 || 20 Dec 2020 || 115 || align=left | Disc.: SpacewatchAlt.: 2014 UK147, 2017 FG115 || 
|- id="2003 SQ267" bgcolor=#d6d6d6
| 0 ||  || MBA-O || 16.8 || 2.4 km || multiple || 2003–2019 || 02 Nov 2019 || 80 || align=left | Disc.: SpacewatchAlt.: 2016 CS180 || 
|- id="2003 SU267" bgcolor=#fefefe
| 1 ||  || MBA-I || 18.68 || data-sort-value="0.55" | 550 m || multiple || 2003–2021 || 11 May 2021 || 157 || align=left | Disc.: Spacewatch || 
|- id="2003 SV267" bgcolor=#E9E9E9
| 2 ||  || MBA-M || 18.61 || 1.1 km || multiple || 2003–2021 || 28 Sep 2021 || 34 || align=left | Disc.: SpacewatchAdded on 30 September 2021 || 
|- id="2003 SA268" bgcolor=#E9E9E9
| 0 ||  || MBA-M || 17.84 || 1.5 km || multiple || 2003–2021 || 30 Oct 2021 || 52 || align=left | Disc.: SpacewatchAdded on 30 September 2021Alt.: 2012 QX71 || 
|- id="2003 SJ268" bgcolor=#d6d6d6
| 0 ||  || MBA-O || 16.9 || 2.3 km || multiple || 2003–2019 || 19 Nov 2019 || 45 || align=left | Disc.: Spacewatch || 
|- id="2003 SR268" bgcolor=#d6d6d6
| 0 ||  || MBA-O || 17.8 || 1.5 km || multiple || 1998–2021 || 08 Jun 2021 || 26 || align=left | Disc.: LPL/Spacewatch IIAdded on 19 October 2020 || 
|- id="2003 SS268" bgcolor=#fefefe
| 2 ||  || MBA-I || 18.7 || data-sort-value="0.54" | 540 m || multiple || 2003–2018 || 12 Sep 2018 || 26 || align=left | Disc.: LPL/Spacewatch II || 
|- id="2003 SU268" bgcolor=#d6d6d6
| 0 ||  || MBA-O || 17.1 || 2.1 km || multiple || 2003–2019 || 27 Oct 2019 || 61 || align=left | Disc.: LPL/Spacewatch II || 
|- id="2003 SW268" bgcolor=#E9E9E9
| 0 ||  || MBA-M || 17.96 || 1.4 km || multiple || 2003–2021 || 26 Nov 2021 || 90 || align=left | Disc.: Spacewatch || 
|- id="2003 SX268" bgcolor=#E9E9E9
| 2 ||  || MBA-M || 18.0 || 1.1 km || multiple || 2003–2020 || 14 Oct 2020 || 25 || align=left | Disc.: LPL/Spacewatch IIAdded on 17 January 2021 || 
|- id="2003 SA269" bgcolor=#fefefe
| 0 ||  || MBA-I || 18.1 || data-sort-value="0.71" | 710 m || multiple || 2003–2021 || 15 May 2021 || 89 || align=left | Disc.: Uccle Obs.Alt.: 2014 OR316 || 
|- id="2003 SF269" bgcolor=#d6d6d6
| 0 ||  || MBA-O || 16.1 || 3.4 km || multiple || 2003–2021 || 04 Jan 2021 || 162 || align=left | Disc.: Berg. GladbachAlt.: 2014 ST278 || 
|- id="2003 SG269" bgcolor=#fefefe
| 0 ||  || MBA-I || 18.5 || data-sort-value="0.59" | 590 m || multiple || 2003–2019 || 26 Oct 2019 || 74 || align=left | Disc.: Berg. Gladbach || 
|}
back to top

References 
 

Lists of unnumbered minor planets